= Alondra Nelson =

American sociologist, policy advisor and author (born 1968)

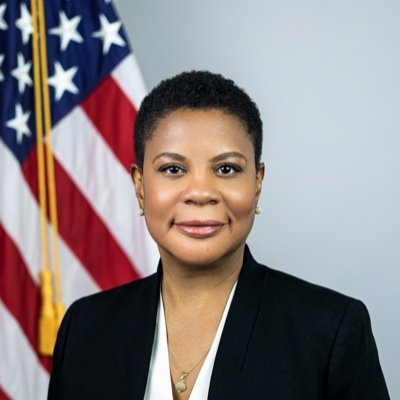
- Official portrait, 2022

Director of the Office of Science and Technology Policy
- Acting
- In office February 18, 2022 – October 3, 2022
- President: Joe Biden
- Preceded by: Eric Lander
- Succeeded by: Arati Prabhakar

Personal details
- Born: April 22, 1968 (age 58) Bethesda, Maryland, U.S.
- Education: University of California, San Diego (BA); New York University (MPhil, PhD)

Alondra Nelson (born April 22, 1968) is an American academic, policy advisor, non-profit administrator, and writer. She is the Harold F. Linder chair and professor in the School of Social Science at the Institute for Advanced Study, an independent research center in Princeton, New Jersey. Since March 2023, she has been a distinguished senior fellow at the Center for American Progress. In October 2023, she was nominated by the Biden-Harris Administration and appointed by United Nations Secretary-General António Guterres to the UN High-Level Advisory Body on Artificial Intelligence.

From 2021 to 2023, Nelson was deputy assistant to President Joe Biden and principal deputy director for science and society of the White House Office of Science and Technology Policy (OSTP), where she performed the duties of the director from February to October 2022. She was the first African American and first woman of color to lead OSTP. Prior to her role in the Biden Administration, she served for four years as president and CEO of the Social Science Research Council, an independent, nonpartisan international nonprofit organization. Nelson was previously professor of sociology at Columbia University, where she served as the inaugural Dean of Social Science, as well as director of the Institute for Research on Women and Gender. She began her academic career on the faculty of Yale University.

She has authored or edited articles, essays, and books including The Social Life of DNA: Race, Reparations, and Reconciliation after the Genome (2016). She is on the advisory board of the Schwartz Reisman Institute for Technology and Society.

== Early life and education ==
In 1994, Nelson earned a Bachelor of Science degree in anthropology, magna cum laude, from the University of California, San Diego. While there, she was elected to Phi Beta Kappa. She earned a Ph.D. in American studies from New York University in 2003. Nelson has received honorary degrees from Amherst College, Northeastern University, Rutgers University, and the City College of New York.

== Career ==
From fall 1999 to spring 2001, Nelson was the New York University Minority Dissertation Fellow in the Department of American Studies at Skidmore College.

From 2003 to 2009, Nelson was an assistant professor and associate professor of African American studies and sociology at Yale University, where she was the recipient of the Poorvu Award for Interdisciplinary Teaching Excellence and a Faculty Fellow in Trumbull College. At Yale, Nelson was the first African American woman to join the Department of Sociology faculty since the department's founding 128 years earlier.

Nelson was recruited to Columbia from Yale in 2009 as an associate professor of sociology and gender studies. She was the first African American to be tenured in the Department of Sociology at this institution. At Columbia, she directed the Institute for Research on Women and Gender (now the Institute for Gender and Sexuality), founded the Columbia University Women's, Gender, and Sexuality Council, and served as the first Dean of Social Science for the Faculty of Arts and Sciences. As dean, Nelson led the first strategic planning process for the social sciences at Columbia University, successfully restructured the Institute for Social and Economic Research and Policy, and helped to establish several initiatives, including the Atlantic Fellows for Racial Equity program, the Eric J. Holder Initiative for Civil and Political Rights, the June Jordan Fellowship Program, the Precision Medicine and Society Program, and the Sabancı Center for Turkish Studies. She left the Columbia University faculty in June 2019 to assume the Harold F. Linder chair and professorship at the Institute for Advanced Study, "the Princeton, New Jersey, organization that once housed the likes of Albert Einstein and J. Robert Oppenheimer."

In February 2017, the Social Science Research Council board of directors announced its selection of Nelson as the 94-year old organization's fourteenth president and CEO, succeeding Ira Katznelson. She was the first African American, first person of color, and second woman to lead the Social Science Research Council. Nelson's tenure as SSRC president ended in 2021 and was hailed as "transformative," particularly in the areas of intellectual innovation and institutional collaboration. At the SSRC, she established programs in the areas of new media and emerging technology; democracy and politics; international collaboration; anticipatory social research, and the study of inequality, including: the Social Data Initiative, "an ambitious research project that aimed to give academics access to troves of Facebook data in order to examine the platform's impact on democracy," the Just Tech Fellowship, MediaWell, a misinformation and disinformation research platform, Democratic Anxieties in the Americas, the Transregional Collaboratory on the Indian Ocean, the Religion, Spirituality, and Democratic Renewal fellowship, the Arts Research with Communities of Color program, the Inequality Initiative, and the widely praised and influential COVID-19 and the Social Sciences platform.

Prior to her White House appointment, Nelson served on the boards of directors of the American Association for the Advancement of Science, the Andrew W. Mellon Foundation, the Center for Research Libraries, the Data and Society Research Institute, the Rockefeller Archive Center, the Russell Sage Foundation, the Teagle Foundation, and the United States International University Africa in Nairobi, Kenya. She is Director of the Brotherhood/Sister Sol, a Harlem-based youth development organization, the John D. and Catherine T. MacArthur Foundation, the Innocence Project, and Mozilla.

Nelson was a member of the board for African-American Affairs at Monticello. She served on the advisory board of the Obama Presidency Oral History Project.

From 2014 to 2017, Nelson was the academic curator for the YWCA of New York City and was also a member of its program committee.

Nelson was a juror for the inaugural Aspen Words Literary Prize in 2017. She served as a juror for the Andrew Carnegie Fellows Program from 2018 to 2021, and since 2023.

Nelson has been elected to the American Academy of Arts and Sciences, the American Philosophical Society, the National Academy of Medicine (NAM), the American Association for the Advancement of Science, the American Academy of Political and Social Science, and the Sociological Research Association. She is a life member of the Council on Foreign Relations.

Before joining the Biden Administration, Nelson was co-chair of the NAM Committee on Emerging Science, Technology, and Innovation, and a member of the National Academy of Engineering Committee on Responsible Computing Research. She has been a member of the World Economic Forum Network on AI, the Internet of Things, and the Future of Trust, and the Council on Big Data, Ethics, and Society. Nelson is past chair of the American Sociological Association's Science, Knowledge, and Technology section; from 2020 to 2021, she was president-elect of the international scholarly association, the Society for Social Studies of Science, relinquishing this leadership role when she assumed the role of OSTP deputy director for science and society.

Nelson has been a visiting scholar or fellow at the Max Planck Institute for the History of Science, the BIOS Centre for the Study of Bioscience, Biomedicine, Biotechnology and Society at the London School of Economics, the Bavarian American Academy, the Bayreuth Academy, and the International Center for Advanced Studies at New York University.

== Political appointment and public service ==
On February 17, 2022, President Joe Biden announced that Nelson, whom he'd previously appointed deputy director for science and society in the Office of Science and Technology Policy (OSTP), would lead OSTP until permanent leadership could be confirmed. She was also appointed as deputy assistant to the president at this time. She was the first Black person and first woman of color to lead OSTP in the office's 46-year history. In this interim role, Nelson led "OSTP's six policy divisions in their work to advance critical administration priorities, including groundbreaking clean energy investments; a people's Bill of Rights for automated technologies; a national strategy for STEM equity; appointment of the nation's Chief Technology Officer; data-driven guidance for implementing the Bipartisan Infrastructure Law; a transformative, life-saving Community Connected Health initiative; and programs to ensure the U.S. remains a magnet for the world's top innovators and scientists." Nelson served as acting director until October 3, 2022, when she swore in Arati Prabhakar as the U.S. Senate-confirmed director of OSTP.

Her January 2021 appointment as OSTP deputy director for science and society was praised as an "inspired choice" of "a distinguished scholar and thought leader," whose "scholarship on genetics, social inequality and medical discrimination is deeply insightful and hugely influential across multiple fields, most notably because of its focus on excellence, equity and fairness in scientific and medical innovation." Others anticipated Nelson would "open... many doors... to [create] a more inclusive government;" Protocol said she was "the embodiment" of candidate Biden's commitment "to bring a civil rights lens to all of his administration's policies, including tech policy." Science magazine reported that Nelson's appointment reflected President Biden's concern with how the "benefits of science and technology remain unevenly distributed across racial, gender, economic, and geographic lines."

As OSTP principal deputy director for science and society, Nelson oversaw the work of the scientific integrity task force, an interagency body mandated in President Biden's "Memorandum on Restoring Trust in Government Through Scientific Integrity and Evidence-Based Policymaking" to review scientific integrity policies and practices in the federal government, including cases of improper political interference in scientific research, and the distortion of scientific and technological data and findings. Her portfolio also include open science policy, policy to strengthen and broaden participation in the STEM fields, and new and emerging technology policy. She co-chaired the Equitable Data Working Group, a body that was established by President Biden by Executive Order 13985, Advancing Racial Equity and Support for Underserved Communities Through the Federal Government, and co-authored its report. On October 8, 2021, Nelson co-authored an op-ed with OSTP Director Eric Lander announcing a policy planning process for the creation of an "AI Bill of Rights." On October 4, 2022, OSTP released the "Blueprint for an AI Bill of Rights."

As OSTP acting director for eight months, Nelson "push[ed] policymaking motivated by... the notion that emerging technologies should be built with the fundamental rights held by citizens in a democratic society as their blueprint," including digital assets, climate and energy science and technology innovation, artificial intelligence, privacy-enhancing technologies, and public health measures such as indoor air quality for COVID-19 mitigation.

With Jake Sullivan and Brian Deese, she served as co-chair of the White House CHIPS Implementation Steering Council, a body established by President Biden executive order to coordinate effective implementation of the CHIPS and Science Act of 2022 across the administration. The executive order established six priorities to guide CHIPS Act implementation: protect taxpayer dollars through rigorous review and accountability; meet economic and national security needs by reducing reliance on vulnerable foreign production; ensure long-term U.S. leadership through a collaborative network for semiconductor research and innovation; strengthen regional manufacturing and innovation clusters with investments across the supply chain; catalyze private sector investment by filling market gaps and reducing risk; and generate benefits for a broad range of stakeholders, including startups, workers, disadvantaged businesses, universities, and underserved communities.

Nelson advanced President Biden's Cancer Moonshot and administered the Cancer Cabinet. She encouraged greater transparency and engagement with the public in science and technology policy, championing public access to federal research, community-engaged science, and frequent external-facing communication about OSTP's work.

Nelson represented United States in science and technology policy on the world stage, including at the OECD, the World Academy of Sciences, the Geneva Science and Diplomacy Anticipator, in meetings with the Republic of Korea, the European Commission, the Council of Europe, the Netherlands, Austria, Japan, the United Kingdom and others, and as Head of Delegation at the G7 Science Ministerial in Frankfurt, Germany - this meeting's topics included protecting the freedom, integrity and security of science and research; contributions of research to combating climate change; research on COVID-19 and its impacts; and support the rebuilding of Ukraine's science and research ecosystem.

Nelson's tenure at OSTP ended in February 2023 at the conclusion of her public service leave from the Institute for Advanced Study.

In October 2023, she was nominated by the White House, and then appointed by United Nations Secretary-General António Guterres, to serve on the UN High-level Advisory Body on Artificial Intelligence.

On October 15, 2024, President Biden announced his appointment of Nelson to the National Science Board of the National Science Foundation. On May 13, 2025, Nelson resigned from the National Science Board, citing concerns about political interference with the board's advisory functions, according to her resignation letter in TIME. In November 2025, she was appointed to the Transition Committee of New York City Mayor-elect Zohran Mamdani, advising on technology policy.

== Artificial intelligence policy and governance ==
She has played a prominent role in shaping artificial intelligence (AI) governance, ethics, and public policy at national and international levels. In 2023, she was named to TIME’s inaugural TIME100 AI list, which recognizes the 100 most influential individuals shaping the future of artificial intelligence, citing her leadership in public-interest–oriented AI policy. During her tenure at OSTP, Nelson led the development of the Blueprint for an AI Bill of Rights, a framework designed to guide governments and technology developers in protecting civil rights, civil liberties, and democratic values in the deployment of automated systems.

In 2023, Nelson introduced the concept of “thick alignment” in discussions of artificial intelligence safety and ethics, drawing on philosophical and anthropological ideas of “thick description." The concept emphasizes sociotechnical analyses that account for contextual, cultural, and value-laden dimensions of human life, rather than narrowly defined technical objectives. A thick alignment perspective argues that AI systems should be designed and governed in ways that reflect complex human values, intentions, and diverse social contexts.

Nelson was nominated by the White House and appointed by United Nations Secretary-General António Guterres as the United States representative to the United Nations High-Level Advisory Body on Artificial Intelligence, a multidisciplinary group tasked with advancing international cooperation and inclusive global governance of AI. She was a key participant in the AI Safety Summit held at Bletchley Park in the United Kingdom in 2023, the first global summit convened to address the risks and governance challenges associated with advanced AI systems. Nelson later served on the Steering Committee of the AI Action Summit in Paris, France, the world's second global AI convening, and there she delivered remarks at the Élysée Palace outlining what she described as the “Three Fallacies” of AI, critiquing assumptions about technological inevitability and neutrality in AI development. Nelson spoke on several panels at the AI Impact Summit in New Dehli, India in 2026.

Nelson serves as a senior advisor on civil rights and technology policy, including work related to algorithmic accountability and the societal impacts of AI, and regularly advises local, state, national, and international governments, as well as philanthropic organizations and industry, on science and technology governance. She is a co-author of Auditing AI with The Marquand House Collective, a book examining mechanisms for accountability, transparency, and oversight in AI systems. Nelson is a member of the Advisory Board of the International Association for Safe and Ethical AI (IASEAI), an organization dedicated to promoting responsible AI development. She is a Senior Adviser to the International AI Safety Report, a global initiative that brings together experts to assess frontier AI risks and inform international AI safety policymaking.

Nelson’s contributions to artificial intelligence governance, digital civil rights, and science and technology policy have been recognized through numerous honors. In 2023, she was named to TIME’s inaugural TIME100 AI list, recognizing the world’s most influential individuals shaping the future of artificial intelligence. In 2024, she received the World Leader in AI World Society Award from the Boston Global Forum for her global leadership in aligning AI development with democratic and societal values. In 2022, Nature named Nelson as one of its “10 People Who Shaped Science”, citing her influence on science and technology policy, including the governance and societal implications of artificial intelligence. In 2023, she received the Federation of American Scientists Public Service Award for her leadership in science and technology policy, including work related to AI and equity in STEM. That same year, she was awarded the Sage–Center for Advanced Study in the Behavioral Sciences (CASBS) Award, which honors outstanding achievement in the behavioral and social sciences that advances understanding of pressing societal issues, including technology governance. In 2025, Nelson received the NAACP–Archewell Digital Civil Rights Award for her work advancing digital equity and civil rights in technology policy.

== Writing ==
Nelson writes and lectures widely on the intersection of science, technology, medicine, and social inequality. She has published articles, essay, and books, including, most recently, ''The Social Life of DNA: Race, Reparations, and Reconciliation after the Genome.'' Nelson has also written extensively about genetics, genomics, race, and racialization. "At its core, her philosophy was that focusing solely on those communities' exclusion not just misread the past, but shriveled the future possibilities innovation holds for them," Politico noted.

=== 1990s through 2009 ===
Nelson is a pioneer in study of race and technology, a field of inquiry she helped to establish in the late 1990s. In 2001, with co-authors, Nelson contributed a chapter to, and co-edited - with Thuy Linh N. Tu - Technicolor: Race, Technology and Everyday Life, one of the first scholarly works to examine the racial politics of contemporary technoculture.

Nelson founded and led the Afrofuturism on-line community in 1998, and edited an eponymous special issue of the journal Social Text in 2002. She is also among a small group of social theorists of Afrofuturism. Particularly, her 2002 essay "Future Texts" lends insight onto the inequitable access to technologies. Nelson explained Afrofuturism as a way of looking at the subject position of Black people that covers themes of alienation and aspirations for a better future. Additionally, Nelson notes that discussions around race, access, and technology often bolster uncritical claims about the "digital divide." The digital-divide framing, she argues, may overemphasize the role of access to technology in reducing inequality as opposed to other non-technical factors. Noting the racial stereotyping work of the "digital divide" concept, she writes, "Blackness gets constructed as always oppositional to technologically driven chronicles of progress." She continued, "Forecasts of a race-free (to some) utopian future and pronouncements of the dystopian digital divide are the predominant discourses of blackness and technology in the public sphere. What matters is less a choice between these two narratives... and more what they have in common: namely the assumption that race is a liability in the twenty-first century... either negligible or evidence of negligence."

In February 2005, Nelson was named one of "13 Notable Blacks In Technology" by Black Voices.

=== 2010s through present ===
Nelson's 2011 book, Body and Soul: The Black Panther Party and the Fight Against Medical Discrimination, was praised by Publishers Weekly as deserving "commendation for its thoughtfulness and thoroughness," was noted as "a much-needed and major work that will set the standard for scholars" by the American Historical Review, and was hailed by leading scholar Henry Louis Gates Jr. as "a revelation" and "a tremendously important book." Body and Soul inspired an October 2016 special issue of the American Journal of Public Health on the Black Panther Party's health legacy, which Nelson co-curated, and was recognized with several awards, including the Mirra Komarovsky Book Award.

With co-authors, Nelson contributed chapters to, and co-edited - with Keith Wailoo and Catherine Lee - Genetics and the Unsettled Past: The Collision of DNA, Race, and History, published in 2012.

In 2016, she published The Social Life of DNA: Race, Reparations, and Reconciliation After the Genome, considered to be a "landmark book" by the Washington Informer. Kirkus Reviews described Nelson's book about the uses of genetic ancestry testing in Black communities, as a "meticulously detailed" work that "adds another chapter to the somber history of injustice toward African-Americans, but... one in which science is enriching lives by forging new identities and connections to ancestral homelands."

Writer Isabel Wilkerson hailed the book as the work of "one of this generation's most gifted scholars." The Social Life of DNA received honorable mention for the 2021 Diana Forsythe Book Award, was a finalist for the 2017 Hurston/Wright Legacy Award for Nonfiction, and was named a Favorite Book of 2016 by The Wall Street Journal.

=== Periodicals and other writing ===
Nelson's writing and commentary have appeared in The New York Times, The Washington Post, Foreign Affairs, The Boston Globe, The Guardian (London), and The Chronicle of Higher Education, among other publications.

== Awards and honors ==
Nelson has received several awards, honors, and distinctions:

- Phi Beta Kappa, University of California, San Diego, 1994
- Henry Mitchell MacCracken Fellowship and Dean's Fellowship, New York University, 1995
- Trustee Dissertation Fellowship, Skidmore College, 2000
- Ann E. Plato Predoctoral Fellowship, Trinity College, 2001
- Non-Resident Fellow, W.E.B. Du Bois Institute, Harvard University, 2005
- 13 Notable Blacks In Technology, Black Voices, 2005
- Poorvu Family Award for Interdisciplinary Teaching Excellence, Yale University, 2006
- Ford Foundation Postdoctoral Diversity Fellowship, 2006
- Career Enhancement Fellowship for Junior Faculty, Woodrow Wilson National Fellowship Foundation and Andrew W. Mellon Foundation, 2006
- Junior Faculty Fellowship, Yale University, 2006
- Fellow, International Center for Advanced Studies, New York University, 2007
- Fellow, Max Planck Institute for the History of Science, Berlin, 2011
- Mirra Komarovsky Book Award for Body and Soul, 2012
- American Sociological Association Distinguished Contribution to Scholarship Book Award for Body and Soul, 2012
- Letitia Woods Brown Award for Body and Soul, 2012
- Best Book Award from the Association for Humanist Sociology for Body and Soul, 2012
- C. Wright Mills Award (finalist) for Body and Soul, 2012
- Just Wellness Award from the Third Root Community Health Center for Body and Soul, a "work at the nexus of healing and social justice," 2013
- African American Culture and Philosophy Award, Purdue University, 2014
- Visiting Fellow, Academy of Advanced African Studies, University of Bayreuth, 2014
- A Favorite Book of 2016, The Wall Street Journal for The Social Life of DNA, 2016
- Hurston/Wright Legacy Award for Nonfiction (finalist) for The Social Life of DNA, 2017
- Elected to Membership, Sociological Research Association, 2017
- Elected as a Fellow of the American Academy of Political and Social Science, 2018
- Elected as a Fellow of The Hastings Center, 2018
- Top 35 Women in Higher Education, Diverse: Issues in Higher Education, 2020
- Diana Forsythe Prize (Honorable Mention) from the Committee for the Anthropology of Science, Technology & Computing and the Society for the Anthropology of Work of the American Anthropological Association for The Social Life of DNA, 2020
- Morison Prize, recognizing outstanding individuals who combine humanistic values with effectiveness in practical affairs, particularly in science and technology, Massachusetts Institute of Technology, 2020
- Elected to Membership, American Academy of Arts and Sciences, 2020
- Elected to Membership, American Philosophical Society, 2020
- Elected to Membership, National Academy of Medicine, 2020
- Doctor of Humane Letters, honoris causa, CUNY: The City College of New York, 2021
- Elected a Fellow of the American Association for the Advancement of Science, 2021
- 2022 Tech Titan, Washingtonian Magazine
- Doctor of Science, honoris causa, Rutgers University, 2022
- Nature's 10 People Who Shaped Science in 2022
- Doctor of Public Service, honoris causa, Northeastern University, 2023
- Champion of Freedom Award, Electronic Privacy Information Center, 2023
- Sage-CASBS Award, for "outstanding achievement in the behavioral and social sciences that advances our understanding of pressing social issues," Center for Advanced Study in the Behavioral Sciences, Stanford University, 2023
- Inaugural Friedrich Schiedel Prize for Social Sciences and Technology for "pioneering work and outstanding and field-building contributions at the intersection of social sciences and technology," Technical University of Munich, 2023
- 2023 Tech Titan, Washingtonian Magazine
- Time 100 Most Influential People in AI, 2023
- Federation of American Scientists Public Service Award, "for leadership on both AI regulation and advancing equity in STEM fields," 2023
- 2024 World Leader in AI World Society Award
- Dorothy Irene Height Award/Global Trailblazer Award honoring "individuals who have contributed significantly to their fields and have created new opportunities and pathways for themselves and others," New York University, 2024
- Alumni Changemaker Award, University of California at San Diego, 2024
- 2024 Tech Titan, Washingtonian Magazine
- Morals & Machines Award, 2024
- Dr. Martin Luther King, Jr. Humanitarian Award, New York University, 2025
- NAACP - Archewell Digital Civil Rights Award, 56th NAACP Image Awards, 2025
- Doctor of Humane Letters, honoris causa, Amherst College, 2025
- IP3 Award, Public Knowledge, for "ingenuity and dedication in the field of information policy," 2025
- Top AI Leaders of 2026, The Industry Leaders
- 100 Women in AI, 2026
- Miles Conrad Award, National Information Standards Organization, 2026

== Personal life ==
She was born in Bethesda, Maryland, in 1968, the daughter of Robert Nelson, a career member of the U.S. Navy and retired master chief petty officer, and Delores Nelson, a cryptographer and systems analyst for the U.S. Army and Department of Defense. The eldest of four siblings, she was raised in San Diego, California. Nelson has one sister, Andrea, and two brothers, Robert and Anthony. She attended the University of San Diego High School, a private coeducational Catholic college-preparatory day school.

Nelson is married to Garraud Etienne, a non-profit executive. She was previously married to Ben Williams, executive features editor at The Washington Post, and former digital editor at GQ and New York Magazine.

== Bibliography ==
- 2001. Technicolor: Race, Technology, and Everyday Life. New York University Press, ed. with Thuy Linh Tu ISBN 0-8147-3604-1.
- 2002. Afrofuturism: A Special Issue of Social Text. Duke University Press, ISBN 0-8223-6545-6.
- 2011. Body and Soul: The Black Panther Party and the Fight Against Medical Discrimination. University of Minnesota Press, ISBN 0-8166-7648-8.
- 2012. Genetics and the Unsettled Past: The Collision of DNA, Race, and History. Rutgers University Press, ed. with Keith Wailoo and Catherine Lee, ISBN 0-8135-5255-9.
- 2016. The Social Life of DNA: Race, Reparations, and Reconciliation After the Genome. Beacon Press, ISBN 0-8070-3301-4.
- 2026. Auditing AI. (co-authored with the Marquand House Collective). MIT Press, ISBN 9780262051729.

Political offices
Preceded by Eric Lander	Director of the Office of Science and Technology Policy; Acting; 2022	Succeeded by Arati Prabhakar
