= Strix =

Strix may refer to:

- Strix (mythology), a legendary creature of ancient Roman mythology
- Strix (bird), a genus of large "earless" wood-owls
- Strix Ltd., John Taylor (inventor)#Career, manufacturer of kettle controls, thermostats and water boiling elements for domestic appliances
- Strix (TV production company), a Swedish production company
- Bofors STRIX, a Swedish guided projectile
- "Strix", a pseudonym of Peter Fleming (writer)
- "Strix", Gaming Hardware lineup from Asus
- Stryx, an Italian television series aired in 1978
- Operation Strix, the codename of the central spy mission in the manga and anime series Spy × Family
- StriX, an Earth observation satellite constellation from the Japanese space company Synspective
- Strix (security), an open-source application security and penetration testing software project
