= AI Security Institute =

British research organisation

- Abbreviation: AISI
- Formation: November 2, 2023; 2 years ago
- Services: AI safety research
- Key people: Minister of Artificial Intelligence Kanishka Narayan
- Parent organization: Office for the Prime Minister and Cabinet
- Website: www.aisi.gov.uk
- Formerly called: AI Safety Institute

The AI Security Institute (AISI) is a research organisation within the United Kingdom's Office for the Prime Minister and Cabinet that aims "to equip governments with a scientific understanding of the risks posed by advanced AI". It conducts research, and develops and tests mitigations. It was the first institution of its kind, and has since seen similar artificial intelligence safety institutions modelled after it established by governments of other countries.

== History ==
The organisation, initially named the AI Safety Institute, was launched in November 2023 under the Rishi Sunak premiership as part of the AI Safety Summit 2023 event at Bletchley Park. Sunak had announced the plan to establish the institute the week prior, during a press conference on 26 October 2023.

In February 2025, under the premiership of Keir Starmer, the institute was renamed to the AI Security Institute. Announced by Secretary of State for Science, Innovation and Technology Peter Kyle at the Munich Security Conference, the move was intended to reflect the institute's renewed focus on "serious AI risks with security implications, such as how the technology can be used to develop chemical and biological weapons, how it can be used to carry out cyber-attacks, and enable crimes such as fraud and child sexual abuse."

In July 2026, with the dissolution of the Department for Science, Innovation and Technology as part of incoming Prime Minister Andy Burnham's broader governmental reorganization, the institute was relocated under the newly formed Office for the Prime Minister and Cabinet.

== Organization ==
The institute is designed "like a startup in the government, combining the authority of government with the expertise and agility of the private sector".

The institute is overseen by the Minister of Artificial Intelligence, Kanishka Narayan.

== Research ==
As of February 2026, AISI has access agreements with Anthropic, Google and OpenAI to test their models before release. It has an open-source platform called Inspect that permits companies, governments and academics to run standardised safety tests for AI usage. Among its work is the reported detection of multiple serious vulnerabilities that could enable development of biological weapons; the vulnerabilities were fixed before the model was launched.

It conducts research on diverse fields of AI application. One study by AISI found that large language models (LLMs) post-trained for political persuasiveness became systematically less accurate and up to 51% more persuasive on political issues. AISI has also worked on the usage of AI for emotional needs. In December 2025, it found that nearly 10 percent of UK citizens used systems like chatbots for emotional purposes on a weekly basis. At the same time, it found that "systems are now outperforming PhD-level researchers on scientific knowledge tests and helping non-experts succeed at lab work that would previously have been out of reach".

== See also ==
- Alan Turing Institute – UK institute for data science and AI
- Artificial intelligence safety institute – worldwide topic
