= India AI Impact Summit 2026 =

2026 conference in Delhi, India

- Host country: India
- Date: 16–20 February 2026
- Venues: Bharat Mandapam, New Delhi
- Follows: AI Action Summit 2025
- Precedes: AI Summit, Geneva
- Website: impact.indiaai.gov.in

The India AI Impact Summit 2026 (also abbreviated as the AI Impact Summit) was an international summit on artificial intelligence held at Bharat Mandapam, New Delhi, India, from 16 to 21 February 2026. It is the fourth in a series of global AI summits following the Bletchley Park AI Safety Summit in 2023, the AI Seoul Summit in 2024, and the AI Action Summit in Paris in 2025. Organised under the IndiaAI Mission by the Ministry of Electronics and Information Technology, it is the first summit in the series to be hosted by a Global South nation. This series of AI summits will continue with the AI Summit in Geneva to be hosted by Switzerland in 2027.

The summit was inaugurated by Prime Minister Narendra Modi on 19 February 2026. The opening ceremony was also addressed by French President Emmanuel Macron and United Nations Secretary-General António Guterres. The summit was attended by over 20 heads of state and a delegation of global technology leaders including Sundar Pichai (Google), Sam Altman (OpenAI), and Demis Hassabis (DeepMind).

The event faced criticism for organisational issues, misrepresentation of non-Indian products as Indian, and a perceived focus on trade fair activities over substantive governance.

== Background ==
The AI Impact Summit was an international summit on artificial intelligence (AI) held in New Delhi from 16 to 20 February 2026. It followed the AI Action Summit in Paris in February 2025, the AI Seoul Summit in 2024 and the Bletchley Park AI Safety Summit in 2023.

According to Crowell & Moring, the changing summit titles seemed to reflect a broader shift in focus away from AI safety and governance toward practical impact, implementation, and measurable outcomes.

Ahead of the summit, an international panel of experts published the second International AI Safety Report.

The summit was structured around three foundational pillars, termed "Sutras": People, Planet, and Progress. Seven thematic working groups were established to deliver outcomes across these pillars, covering AI for economic growth and social good; democratising AI resources; inclusion for social empowerment; safe and trusted AI; human capital; science; and resilience, innovation, and efficiency.

== Programme ==
The summit ran over five days, later extended to six following overwhelming public response. Originally scheduled to conclude on 20 February, the event was extended to 21 February with expanded evening hours for the exhibition.

=== India AI Impact Expo ===
The India AI Impact Expo, inaugurated by Prime Minister Modi on 16 February, featured over 300 exhibitors from 30 countries across more than 10 thematic pavilions. Pavilions were organised across thematic zones aligned with the summit's three pillars, showcasing AI applications in healthcare, agriculture, education, and sustainable industry.

=== Leaders' Plenary and CEO Roundtable ===
The Leaders' Plenary on 19 February brought together heads of state, ministers, and representatives from multilateral institutions to outline national and global priorities on AI governance, infrastructure, and international cooperation. A CEO Roundtable, held the same evening, convened senior executives from global technology and industry firms with government leaders to discuss investment, research collaboration, and deployment of AI systems.

=== Research Symposium ===
A Research Symposium on AI and its Impact was held on 18 February, with the IIIT Hyderabad as knowledge partner. Discussions covered sovereign AI infrastructure, global adoption challenges, research breakthroughs, and policy priorities.

== Participants ==
The summit drew delegations from over 100 countries, including more than 20 heads of state and 60 ministers. Notable attendees from the technology industry included Sundar Pichai (Google), Sam Altman (OpenAI), Dario Amodei (Anthropic), Demis Hassabis (Google DeepMind), and Mukesh Ambani (Reliance Industries). Representatives from multilateral institutions included Sangbu Kim of the World Bank.

== Announcements and outcomes ==
=== Sarvam AI models ===
Several Indian AI models and products were unveiled during the summit. Sarvam AI, an Indian AI laboratory, launched a new generation of large language models, including 30-billion and 105-billion parameter models using a mixture of experts architecture, as well as text-to-speech, speech-to-text, and vision models. Sarvam also introduced the Kaze smartglasses, described as the company's first hardware product, which Prime Minister Modi tested at the expo.

The government-backed BharatGen Param2 model, a 17-billion parameter model supporting 22 Indian languages with multimodal capabilities, was also launched at the summit.

=== Infrastructure commitments ===
Union Minister Ashwini Vaishnaw outlined India's "whole-of-nation" AI strategy, describing plans to build a "frugal, sovereign and scalable" AI ecosystem. The government announced plans to add more than 20,000 GPUs to India's existing base of 38,000 under the IndiaAI Compute Portal.

Microsoft announced at the summit that it was on track to invest US$50 billion by the end of the decade to bring AI to lower-income countries.

Goa reaffirmed its commitment to artificial intelligence at the India AI Impact Summit 2026.

=== Guinness World Record ===
During the summit, India set a Guinness World Record for the most pledges received for an AI responsibility campaign in 24 hours, with 250,946 valid pledges collected between 16 and 17 February 2026. The campaign, conducted in partnership with Intel India as part of the IndiaAI Mission, exceeded its initial target of 5,000 pledges.

== Controversies and criticisms ==
=== Galgotias University incident ===
On 18 February, Galgotias University faced widespread criticism after a representative presented a robot dog at the university's exhibition pavilion as an indigenous development. Social media users identified the robot as the Unitree Go2, a commercially available product manufactured by Chinese company Unitree Robotics. IT Secretary S. Krishnan stated that the government did not want exhibitors to showcase items that were not their own, and the university was directed to vacate its stall. Galgotias University issued an apology, stating that the representative had been "ill-informed" and was not authorised to speak to the press.

The incident drew political reactions, with the Indian National Congress using it to criticise the government. The controversy was amplified after Union IT Minister Ashwini Vaishnaw had earlier shared a video clip of the robot on social media, which was subsequently deleted.

=== Organisational issues ===
On day 1 of the Summit, Dhananjay Yadav, a Bengaluru-based entrepreneur had alleged that his product was stolen in the Summit. He called it as a pain for the people in an X post. He further wrote, "Think about this: We paid for flights, accommodation, logistics and even the booth. Only to see our wearables disappear inside a high-security zone". Later, the stolen devices were recovered by The Delhi Police.

Bloomberg reported that delegates were left stranded without food or water during a security lockdown ahead of the Prime Minister's visit on 19 February. The summit venue was closed to the public on 19 February for the Prime Minister's visit, leading to criticism from attendees who had registered for that day.

=== Protests by the Indian Youth Congress (IYC) ===
On 20 February, some members of the Indian Youth Congress (IYC) carried out protests inside the venue with slogans such as "PM is compromised" and the criticism of the recent trade deal between India and the US. 4 of these members were sent to police custody by the court on 22 February. While Bharatiya Janata Party condemned these protests, with its spokesperson Shehzad Poonawalla saying, "From being anti-BJP, you have gone to being anti-national? If you have a problem with the BJP, then protest at the BJP office, Jantar Mantar, or outside the PM's office. But the people of the country and their alliance partners condemn them for their attempt to defame India in front of the entire world at the AI Summit." Congress leader Harish Rawat defended the protests, saying "it's also a fact that AI might become a tool in the hands of a few individuals… It's the opposition's job to warn against that… It's not the first time such international events have been opposed. I know how the BJP protested during the Commonwealth Games… To say that such opposition has happened for the first time is not correct. The BJP has been doing this while in the opposition."

These protestors were granted bail by the Delhi high court on 2 March.

== Reception and analysis ==
Bloomberg News reported that Prime Minister Modi used the summit to assert India's global AI ambitions following a challenging year in foreign policy.

TechPolicy.Press published several critical analyses of the summit. One article argued that the summit's structure granted "multinational corporations parity with sovereign governments" through the CEO Roundtable and Leaders' Plenary, while providing no equivalent high-level platform for civil society, labour leaders, or human rights defenders. A separate analysis contended that India's approach to AI governance, like France's before it, treated the summits primarily as trade events, and that any Delhi Declaration was unlikely to translate into substantive global governance commitments.

TechPolicy.Press also reported that the United States delegation arrived at the summit with an agenda centred on "domination" rather than cooperation, framing AI as a geopolitical race against China.

Outlook India published an analysis of the summit's engagement with AI risks, including environmental impact, labour displacement, and the potential for surveillance and bias.

== Global AI Summit series ==
Global AI Summit series
Year	Name	Location	Host
2023	AI Safety Summit	Bletchley Park, United Kingdom	United Kingdom
2024	AI Seoul Summit	Seoul, South Korea	South Korea
2025	AI Action Summit	Paris, France	France
2026	AI Impact Summit	New Delhi, India	India
2027	AI Summit	Geneva, Switzerland	Switzerland
2028	AI Summit	UAE	(United Arab Emirates) UAE

== See also ==
- Artificial intelligence
- AI Safety Summit 2023
- AI Seoul Summit 2024
- AI Action Summit 2025
- Ministry of Electronics and Information Technology
- Global Partnership on Artificial Intelligence
