= AI Safety Summit 2023 =

2023 global summit on AI safety

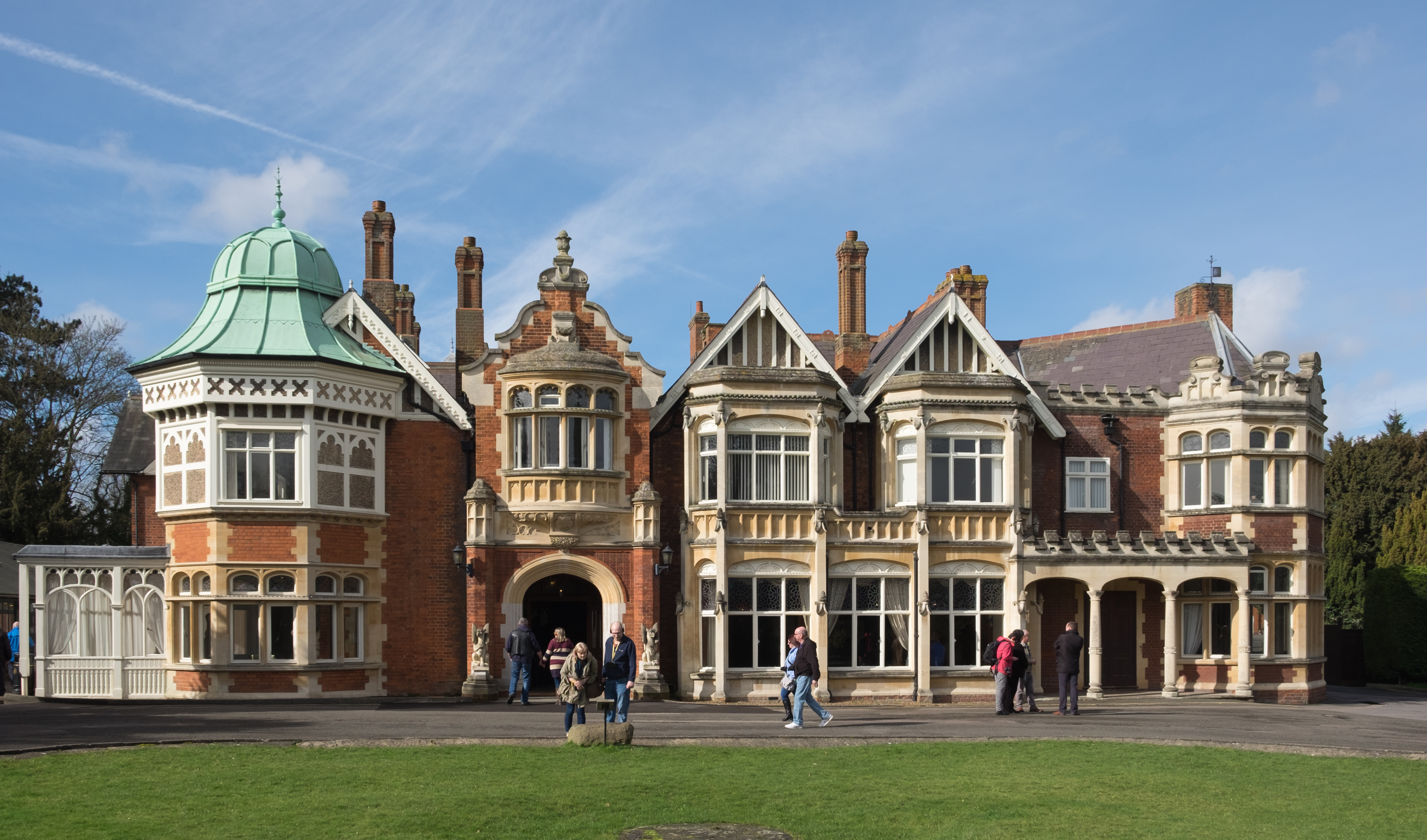
- Bletchley Park Mansion, where the summit was held
- Host country: United Kingdom
- Date: 1–2 November 2023
- Venues: Bletchley Park Mansion, Bletchley Park, Milton Keynes, England
- Precedes: AI Seoul Summit
- Website: aisafetysummit.gov.uk

Key points
- Discussions on the use of the artificial intelligence around the World

The AI Safety Summit 2023 was an international conference on the safety and regulation of artificial intelligence. Organized by the British government, it was held in November 2023 at Bletchley Park, Milton Keynes, England.

The event was the first ever global summit on artificial intelligence. The event led to the release of the Bletchley Declaration, which focused on "identifying AI safety risks of shared concern" and "building respective risk-based policies" to "ensure that the benefits of the technology can be harnessed responsibly for good and for all." The event led to the commission of the International AI Safety Report.

== Background ==
The prime minister of the United Kingdom at the time, Rishi Sunak, made AI one of the priorities of his government, announcing that the UK would host a global AI Safety conference in autumn 2023.

== Venue ==
Bletchley Park was a World War II codebreaking facility established by the British government on the site of a Victorian manor and is in the British city of Milton Keynes. It has played an important role in the history of computing, with some of the first modern computers being built at the facility.

== Outcomes ==
28 countries at the summit, including the United States, China, Australia, and the European Union, have issued an agreement known as the Bletchley Declaration, calling for international co-operation to manage the challenges and risks of artificial intelligence. The Bletchley Declaration affirms that AI should be designed, developed, deployed, and used in a manner that is safe, human-centric, trustworthy and responsible.

Emphasis has been placed on regulating "Frontier AI", a term for the latest and most powerful AI systems. Concerns that have been raised at the summit include the potential use of AI for terrorism, criminal activity, and warfare, as well as existential risk posed to humanity as a whole.

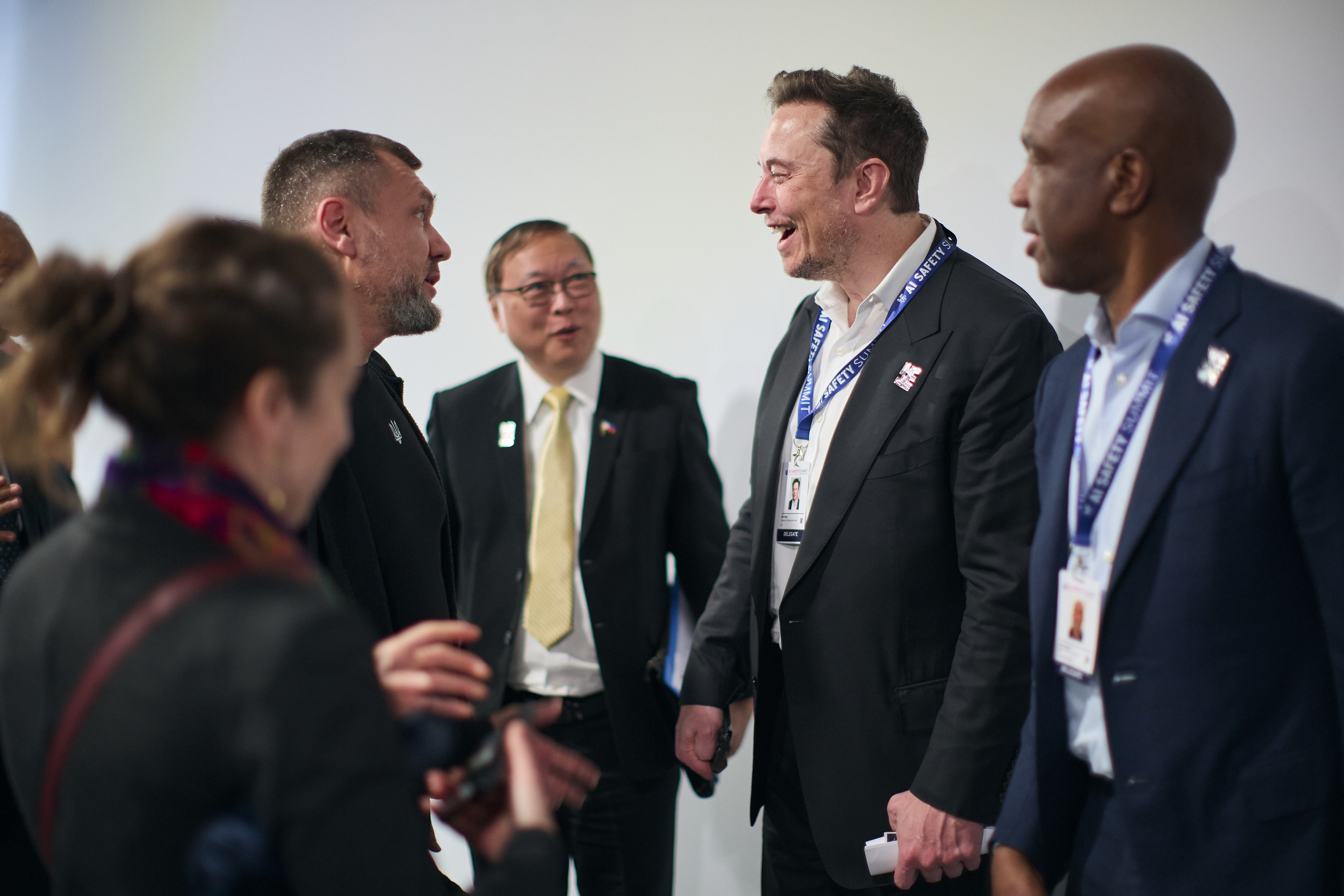
Elon Musk speaks to delegates on day one of the AI Safety Summit.

The president of the United States, Joe Biden, signed an executive order requiring AI developers to share safety results with the US government. The US government also announced the creation of an American AI Safety Institute, as part of the National Institute of Standards and Technology.

The UK's own AI Safety Institute was officially launched on 2 November, following its initial announcement the week prior.

The tech entrepreneur Elon Musk and Sunak did a live interview on AI safety on 2 November on X.

== Notable attendees ==
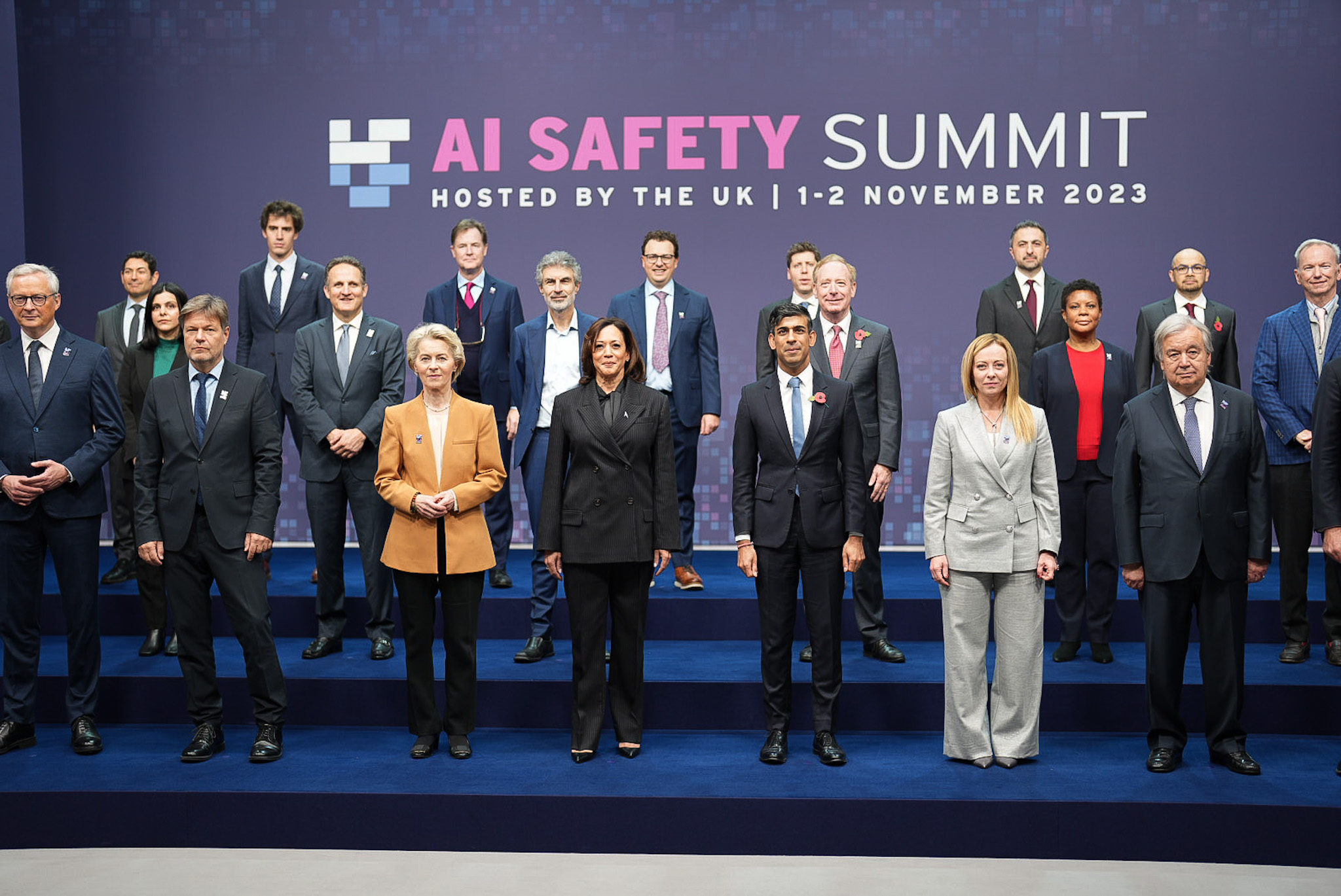

The following individuals attended the summit:

- Rishi Sunak, Prime Minister of the United Kingdom
- Kamala Harris, Vice President of the United States
- Charles III, King of the United Kingdom (attending virtually)
- Elon Musk, CEO of Tesla, owner of X, SpaceX, Neuralink, and xAI
- Giorgia Meloni, Prime Minister of Italy
- Ursula von der Leyen, President of the European Commission
- Sam Altman, CEO of OpenAI
- Nick Clegg, former British politician and president of global affairs at Meta Platforms
- Mustafa Suleyman, co-founder of DeepMind
- Michelle Donelan, UK secretary of state for Science, Innovation and Technology
- Věra Jourová, the European Commission’s vice-president for Values and Transparency
- Gina Raimondo, United States secretary of commerce
- Wu Zhaohui, Chinese vice-minister of science and technology

== Global AI Summit series ==
Global AI Summit series
Year	Name	Location	Host
2023	AI Safety Summit	Bletchley Park, United Kingdom	United Kingdom
2024	AI Seoul Summit	Seoul, South Korea	South Korea
2025	AI Action Summit	Paris, France	France
2026	AI Impact Summit	New Delhi, India	India
2027	AI Summit	Geneva, Switzerland	Switzerland
