= Alliance for Secure AI =

American nonprofit for AI safety

The Alliance for Secure AI is a U.S.-based nonprofit organization which educates the public about the risks of advanced artificial intelligence (AI). Politico has described the Alliance as a "bipartisan nonprofit trying to push a middle-ground approach to AI guardrails."

== History ==
The Alliance for Secure AI was started in 2025 as a 501(c)(3) nonprofit in Washington, D.C. That same month, the organization began a six-figure advertising campaign featuring bipartisan warnings about advanced AI. The ad campaign presented different messages for different political audiences.

The Alliance opposed the idea of a moratorium on state AI laws as part of the July 2025 budget bill, in addition to President Donald Trump's December 2025 executive order on the issue. The group has also criticized AI companies like Meta and OpenAI for what it says are failures to prevent harms to children. In addition, the Alliance has criticized OpenAI for subpoenaing nonprofit organizations in the AI safety space. JobLoss.ai, a website run by the Alliance, says it has tracked more than 125,000 jobs due to AI as of June 2026.

In June 2026, the Alliance called for Congress to set a federal floor for AI regulation while allowing states to adopt stronger protections. The group also praised AI safety measures that were proposed in Florida.

In November 2026, the Alliance and other AI safety nonprofits sued Anthropic, Google, Meta, OpenAI, and SpaceXSI to freeze new AI models, warning of "catastrophic" risk. The complaint was filed in San Francisco County Superior Court under California’s Unfair Competition Law.

== Leadership ==
Brendan Steinhauser, a political and communications strategist, is the founder and CEO of the Alliance. He was an early Tea Party movement organizer, and ran campaigns for multiple members of Congress, including Sen. John Cornyn, Rep. Dan Crenshaw, and Rep. Michael McCaul. Steinhauser has called for an international agreement between the United States and China on AI governance.

Peyton Hornberger is the group's communications director. In July 2025, Hornberger criticized Palantir for its use of AI in a USA Today op-ed column.

Riki Parikh is the Alliance's policy director. He has advocated for stronger AI guardrails at the state level.
