= AI Seoul Summit 2024 =

2024 artificial intelligence conference

- Host country: South Korea and the United Kingdom
- Date: 21–22 May 2024
- Follows: AI Safety Summit
- Precedes: AI Action Summit
- Website: aiseoulsummit.kr

The AI Seoul Summit 2024 was an event in May 2024 co-hosted by the South Korean and British governments. The Seoul Declaration was adopted to address artificial intelligence technology and related challenges and opportunities.

== Background ==
The AI Seoul Summit is the second such meeting following the AI Safety Summit held in the United Kingdom in November 2023. In the Bletchley Declaration, the participating countries agreed to prioritize identifying AI safety risks of shared concern, a shared concern, but at the Seoul Summit, the leaders also recognized the importance of AI.

== Notable attendees ==
The summit was attended by the leaders of Group of Seven countries, including the United States, Canada, France, and Germany, South Korea, Singapore and Australia, representatives of the United Nations, the Organisation for Economic Co-operation and Development, and the European Union.

Also in attendance were representatives of global companies such as Tesla CEO Elon Musk, Samsung Electronics Chairman Lee Jae-yong, ChatGPT maker OpenAI, Google, Microsoft, Meta, and South Korea's top portal operator Naver.

== Topics ==
=== South Korean AI safety center ===
"South Korea will push forward with the establishment of an AI safety research center in Korea and join a network to boost the global safety of AI."

— Yoon Suk Yeol, the President of South Korea

Minister of Science, Lee Jong-ho said that South Korea was planning to open an AI Safety Institute in 2024. He also expressed his intention to strengthen cooperation for the development of international standards.

=== Seoul Declaration for Safe, Innovative and Inclusive AI ===
The Seoul Declaration was adopted at the summit by leaders representing the EU, the US, the UK, Australia, Canada, Germany, France, Italy, Japan, South Korea, and Singapore. The declaration is a commitment to foster international cooperation to help develop AI governance frameworks that are interoperable between countries, partly by integrating the Hiroshima Process International Code of Conduct for Organizations Developing Advanced AI Systems. It advocates for the development of human-centric AI in collaboration with the private sector, academia, and civil society.

=== Seoul Ministerial Statement for advancing AI safety ===
At the ministerial meeting of the summit, the Seoul Ministerial Statement, a joint statement calling for the improvement of the safety, innovation, and inclusivity of AI technologies, was adopted by ministers from Australia, Canada, Chile, France, Germany, India, Indonesia, Israel, Italy, Japan, Kenya, Mexico, the Netherlands, Nigeria, New Zealand, the Philippines, South Korea, Rwanda, Saudi Arabia, Singapore, Spain, Switzerland, Turkey, Ukraine, the United Arab Emirates, the UK, and the US, as well as an EU representative. It aims to develop low-power chips as the AI industry rapidly expands and massive consumption is expected.

== Global AI Summit series ==
Global AI Summit series
Year	Name	Location	Host
2023	AI Safety Summit	Bletchley Park, United Kingdom	United Kingdom
2024	AI Seoul Summit	Seoul, South Korea	South Korea
2025	AI Action Summit	Paris, France	France
2026	AI Impact Summit	New Delhi, India	India
2027	AI Summit	Geneva, Switzerland	Switzerland

== See also ==
- Artificial intelligence
- Foreign relations of South Korea
- AI Action Summit
- AI Impact Summit
