= Bletchley Park House =

Country house estate near London

Coordinates: 51.9966°N 0.7431°W

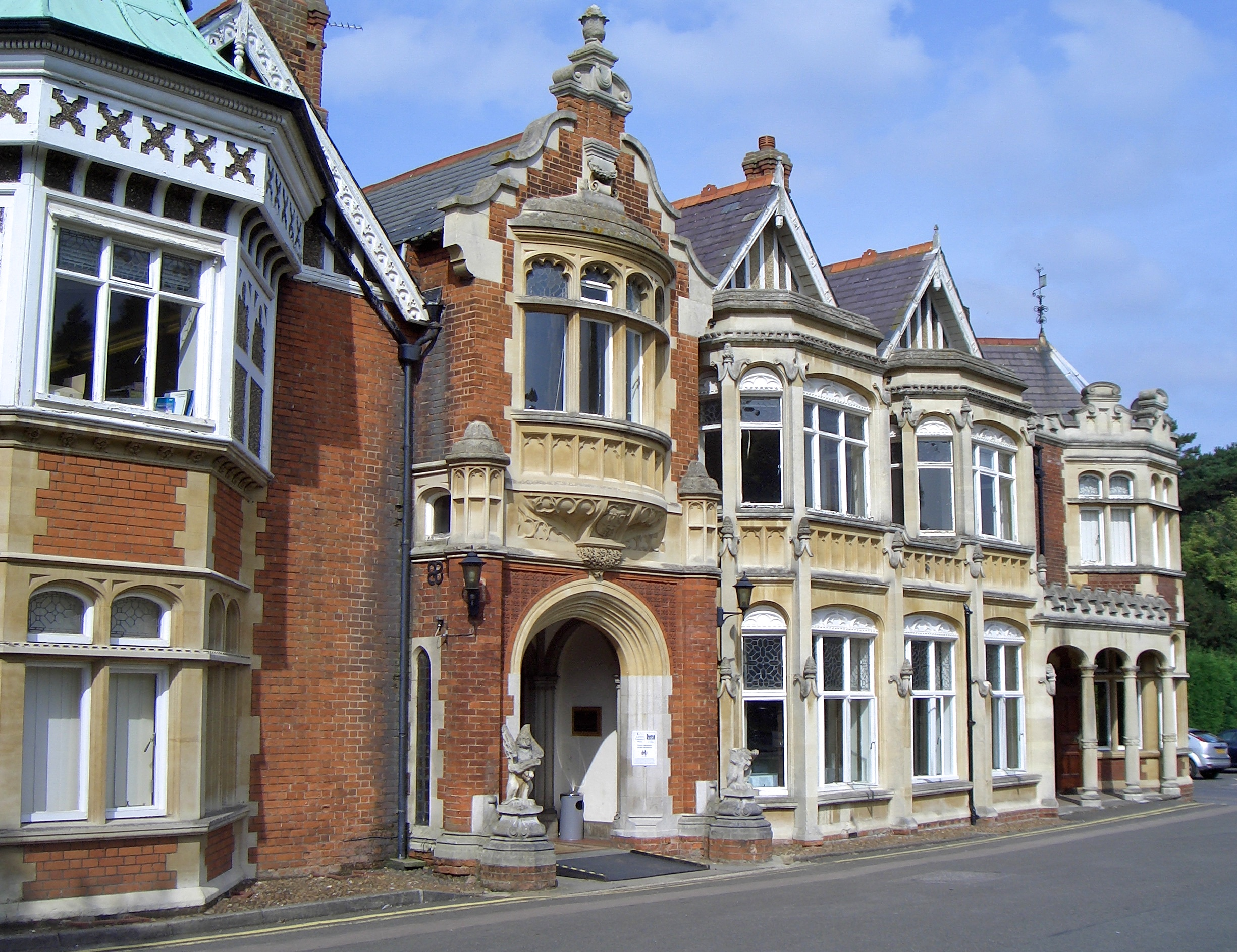
- Interactive map of the Bletchley Park House area

General information
- Type: Country house
- Architectural style: Victorian Gothic; Tudor Revival; Dutch Baroque
- Year built: 1877

Design and construction
- Designations: Grade II listed

Bletchley Park House is a grade II listed English country house in Bletchley, Buckinghamshire. The mansion was constructed during the years following 1883 for the financier and politician Herbert Leon in the Victorian Gothic, Tudor and Dutch Baroque styles, on the site of older buildings of the same name.

The mansion house is the main building in the Bletchley Park estate that became famous for codebreaking during the Second World War. After a period of post-war neglect, the estate is now a museum campus.

== Early history ==
The site appears in the Domesday Book of 1086 as part of the Manor of Eaton. Browne Willis built a mansion there in 1711, but after Thomas Harrison purchased the property in 1793 this was pulled down.

== Construction and pre-war history ==
It was first known as Bletchley Park after its purchase in 1877 by the architect Samuel Lipscomb Seckham, who built a house there. The estate of 581 acres (235 ha) was bought in 1883 by Sir Herbert Samuel Leon, who expanded the house into what architect Landis Gores called a "maudlin and monstrous pile", combining Victorian Gothic, Tudor, and Dutch Baroque styles.

At his Christmas family gatherings there was a fox hunting meet on Boxing Day with glasses of sloe gin from the butler, and the house was always "humming with servants". With 40 gardeners, a flower bed of yellow daffodils could become a sea of red tulips overnight. After the death of Herbert Leon in 1926, the estate continued to be occupied by his widow Fanny Leon (née Higham) until her death in 1937.

== World War II ==
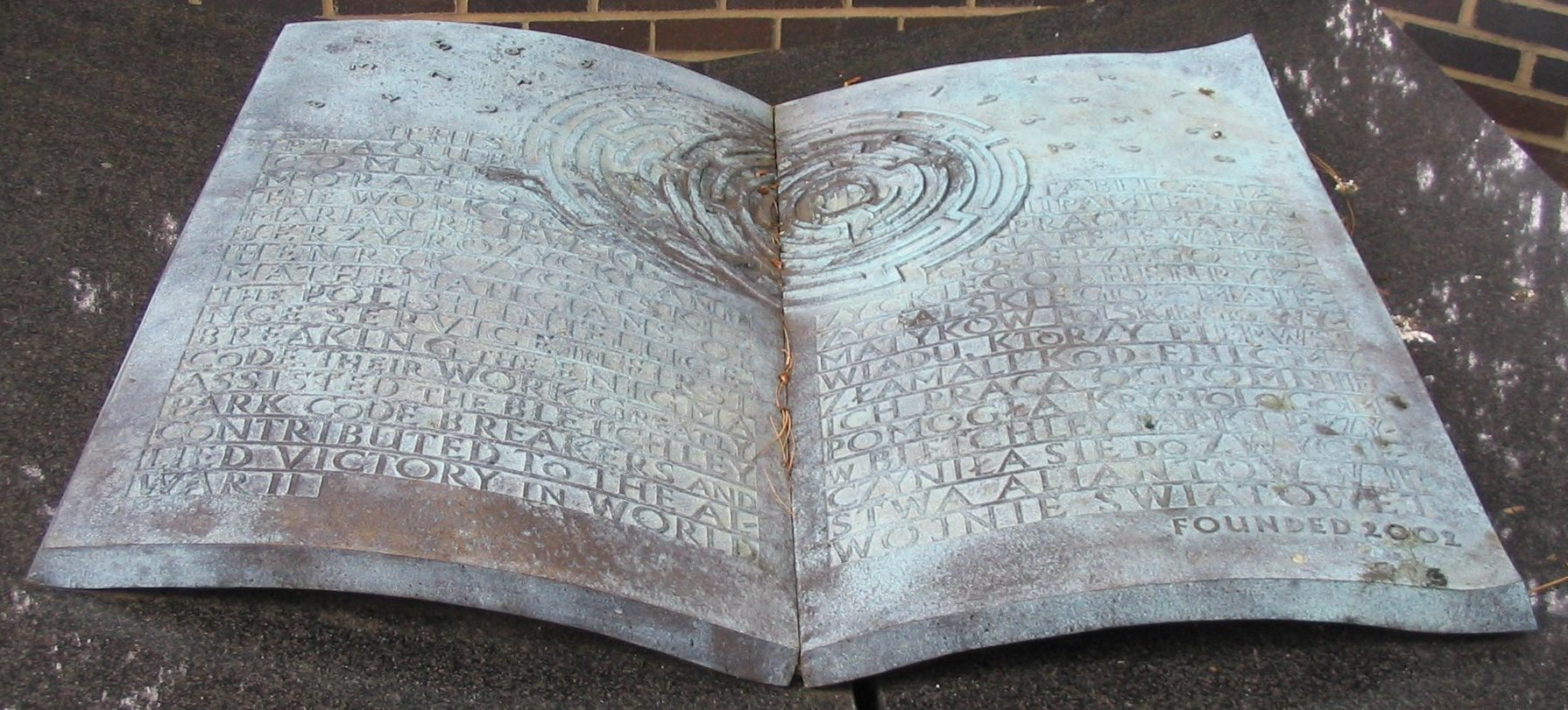
Bletchley's Polish Memorial, commemorating "the [prewar] work of Marian Rejewski, Jerzy Różycki and Henryk Zygalski, mathematicians of the Polish intelligence service, in first breaking the Enigma code. Their work greatly assisted the Bletchley Park code breakers and contributed to the Allied victory in World War II."

In 1938, Hugh Sinclair, head of the Secret Intelligence Service, bought the mansion and land for £6,000 (£349,000 today) for use in the event of war, using his own money. A key advantage was Bletchley's position close to Bletchley railway station, where the "Varsity Line" between Oxford and Cambridge – whose universities were expected to supply many of the code-breakers – met the main West Coast Main Line. The first personnel of the Government Code and Cypher School (GC&CS) moved to Bletchley Park in August 1939.

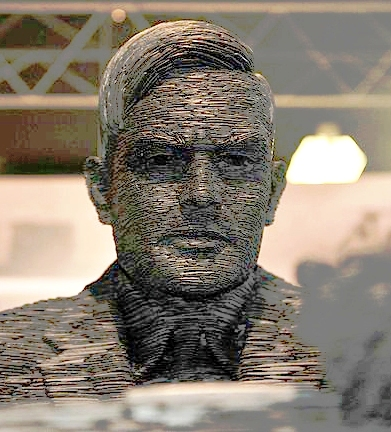
Stephen Kettle's 2007 Alan Turing statue

== Postwar neglect ==
After the war, the Government Code & Cypher School became the Government Communications Headquarters (GCHQ), moving out of Bletchley Park in 1946.

The house passed through a succession of hands and saw a number of uses, including as a teacher-training college, use by the Civil Aviation Authority's Signals Training Establishment and as a local GPO headquarters. In 1990 the site was at risk of being sold for housing development. However, in February 1992, the Milton Keynes Borough Council declared most of the park a conservation area, and the a museum on the site opening to visitors in 1993.

== Sources ==
- McKay, Sinclair (2010), The Secret Life of Bletchley Park: the WWII Codebreaking Centre and the Men and Women Who Worked There, Aurum, ISBN 978-1-84513-539-3
- Morrison, Kathryn, 'A Maudlin and Monstrous Pile': The Mansion at Bletchley Park, Buckinghamshire, English Heritage
- Sebag-Montefiore, Hugh (2017) [2000], Enigma: The Battle for the Code, London: Weidenfeld & Nicolson, ISBN 978-1-4746-0832-9
- Smith, Michael (1999) [1998], Station X: The Codebreakers of Bletchley Park, Channel 4 Books, p. 20, ISBN 978-0-7522-2189-2
