= Blay Whitby =

British philosopher

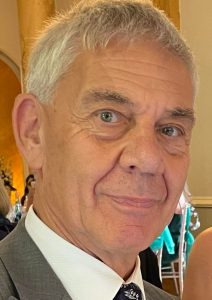
- Education: New College, Oxford (BA, 1974); Middlesex University (PhD, 2003)
- Known for: Ethical implications of artificial intelligence Moral responsibilities of scientific and technical professionals
- Scientific career
- Fields: Philosophy, ethics of technology, artificial intelligence, robotics
- Workplaces: University of Sussex
- Thesis: The Social Implications of Artificial Intelligence (2003)

Blay Whitby is a philosopher and technology ethicist, specialising in computer science, artificial intelligence and robotics. He is based at the University of Sussex, England.

Blay Whitby graduated with first class honours from New College, Oxford University in 1974 and completed his PhD on "The Social Implications of Artificial Intelligence" at Middlesex University in 2003. His publications are predominantly in the area of the philosophy and ethical implications of artificial intelligence. His views place particular stress on the moral responsibilities of scientific and technical professionals, having some features in common with techno-progressivism. Widening engagement in science and increasing levels of debate in ethical issues is also an important concern.

Whitby is an ethics expert for the European Commission, a member of the Ethics Strategic Panel of BCS, the Chartered Institute for IT. He also participates in art/science collaborations.

== Selected publications ==
- Whitby, B.R. (2015) Automating Medicine the Ethical Way in Machine Medical Ethics, Volume 74 of Intelligent Systems, Control and Automation: Science and Engineering pp 223–232
- Whitby, B.R. (2014) The Ethical Implications of Non-Human Agency in Health Care Ethical Problems in System-Patient Interaction
- Whitby, B.R. (2012) Do You Want a Robot Lover? in Robot Ethics: The Ethical and Social Implications of Robotics Lin, P., Bekey, G., and Abney K., MIT Press.
- Whitby, B.R. (2012) On computable morality: An examination of machines as moral advisors in Anderson S. and Anderson M, Machine Ethics, C.U.P. DOI: 10.1017/CBO9780511978036.009
- EPRSC (2011). Principles of robotics. Swindon: Engineering and Physical Sciences Research Council ESPRC.
- Dumitriu A., Holder J, Tikka P., and Whitby, B.R. (2010) Enactive Dialectics, Leonardo, Vol 45, Issue 5
- Whitby B.R. (2008) Computing Machinery and Morality, AI and Society vol 22
- Whitby, B.R. (2003), A.I. A Beginner's Guide, Oxford: OneWorld Publications.
- Whitby, B.R. (1996), Reflections on Artificial Intelligence: The Social, Legal, and Moral Dimensions, Oxford: Intellect Books.
- Whitby, B.R. (1988), A.I., A Handbook of Professionalism, Chichester: Ellis Horwood.
