= Global call for AI red lines =

2025 declaration

The global call for AI red lines is a declaration made on 22 September 2025 calling on governments to define and internationally prohibit unacceptable AI uses and behaviors.

The online declaration was announced by Nobel Peace Prize laureate Maria Ressa at the 80th United Nations General Assembly high-level week. The declaration was initially signed by 200 prominent politicians and scientists, including 10 Nobel Prize winners.

The call does not specify which red lines to set, but suggests several, such as banning bioweapon design, mass surveillance or AI impersonation.

== The declaration ==
The declaration was published online as an open letter on 22 September 2025. Nobel Peace Prize laureate Maria Ressa announced it in her opening speech at the 80th United Nations General Assembly high-level week in New York, urging governments to "define what AI should never be allowed to do" and "establish clear international boundaries to prevent universally unacceptable risks for A.I."

The initiative was organized by three nonprofit organisations: the French Center for AI Safety (CeSIA), The Future Society, and the Center for Human-Compatible Artificial Intelligence (CHAI).

The letter argues that humanity faces risks such as engineered pandemics, widespread disinformation, large-scale manipulation, unemployment and loss of control. Proponents argue that national laws are insufficient to address these risks and that "an international agreement on clear and verifiable red lines is necessary". They urge governments to reach an agreement by the end of 2026, and called for robust enforcement mechanisms and the creation of an independent organisation to implement it.

The letter does not call for specific red lines, but suggests the possibility of banning lethal autonomous weapons, autonomous replication of AI systems and the use of AI in nuclear warfare. Other examples of possible red lines include social scoring, mass surveillance, bioweapon design, AI-generated child sexual abuse material and AI impersonation. A red line could prohibit either AI behaviors (what AI systems should be guaranteed to never do even if asked to) or AI uses.

== Signatories ==
When published, the online declaration was signed by more than 200 prominent politicians and scientists, including 10 Nobel Prize winners. Signers include former president of Colombia Juan Manuel Santos and researchers Geoffrey Hinton and Yoshua Bengio. It also includes popular authors like Stephen Fry and Yuval Noah Harari.

The letter received support from European lawmakers, including former Italian prime minister Enrico Letta, and former president of Ireland Mary Robinson.

== Development of red lines ==
As of 2025, there is no global red line on AI. Some regional red lines exist, such as with the uses deemed "unacceptable" by the AI Act in Europe, and with the US-China agreement not to leave to AI the decision of whether to launch nuclear weapons.

At the United Nations Security Council, days after the declaration, Michael Kratsios, Donald Trump's director of the White House Office of Science and Technology Policy, said "We totally reject all efforts by international bodies to assert centralized control and global governance of AI."

The topic of AI red lines gained prominence in 2026 with the dispute between Anthropic and the Department of Defense (DoD), which resulted from the DoD requesting Anthropic to remove contractual red lines on fully autonomous weapons and mass domestic surveillance. The event led employees from Google and OpenAI as well as Senate Democrats to further call for red lines on military use of AI. Senator Adam Schiff proposed a bill to "codify" Anthropic's red lines.
