= Strix (software) =

Open-source AI-assisted penetration-testing software

- Developer: Strix
- Stable release: 1.6.2 / September 5, 2026
- Written in: Python
- Operating system: Cross-platform
- Platform: Command-line interface, Docker
- Type: Application security, penetration testing
- License: Apache-2.0
- Website: strix.ai
- Repository: github.com/usestrix/strix

Strix AI is an open-source application security and penetration testing software project that uses autonomous agents and large language models to test software for security vulnerabilities. In a May 2026 report on adversarial use of artificial intelligence, Google Threat Intelligence Group described Strix as a "multi-agent penetration testing framework" used to automate vulnerability identification and validation. It is distributed through the usestrix/strix repository on GitHub and as the strix-agent package on PyPI.

The project is associated with Strix, a cybersecurity startup co-founded by Alex Schapiro and Ahmed Allam. In 2026, Strix was discussed in reporting on AI-assisted security testing and vulnerability research, including disclosures involving etcd and Schemata.

== History ==
Strix was co-founded by Alex Schapiro and Ahmed Allam. In April 2026, the Yale Daily News reported that Schapiro, then a Yale student and security researcher, had co-founded the company to develop automated tools for identifying software security flaws. The same report described the company as being in the seed stage and working with enterprise clients.

The software is maintained in the public usestrix/strix GitHub repository. Version 1.0.4 was released on June 9, 2026.

== Software ==
Strix is designed to run security tests against applications, APIs, and codebases. Its repository and package description describe the software as using autonomous agents that can inspect applications, run code dynamically, and attempt to validate findings with proof-of-concept tests.

The project includes command-line tooling and Docker-based execution environments. Its documented tools include browser automation, HTTP request inspection and manipulation, terminal access, Python execution, code analysis, and vulnerability reporting. The PyPI package lists Python 3.12 or later as a requirement and classifies the project as console software for cybersecurity, penetration testing, scanning, and vulnerability testing.

== Vulnerability disclosures ==
=== etcd authorization bypass ===
In March 2026, the etcd project released security updates for authorization-bypass vulnerabilities affecting etcd clusters that used etcd Auth with the gRPC API in untrusted or partially trusted environments. The etcd security release said the vulnerabilities were fixed in etcd 3.6.9, 3.5.28, and 3.4.42.

The GitHub Advisory Database entry for CVE-2026-33413 credited several reporters, including Alex Schapiro and Ahmed Allam from Strix Security, for reporting the vulnerabilities. The advisory stated that the issue allowed unauthorized users to call certain etcd functions in exposed clusters, including functions related to cluster topology, alarms, leases, and compaction.

=== Schemata API exposure ===
In May 2026, CyberScoop reported that an API flaw in Schemata, a defense technology company with U.S. Department of Defense contracts, exposed user records and military training materials through endpoints that lacked meaningful authorization checks. The article described Strix as an open-source autonomous security-testing project and reported that Strix said a low-privilege account could access user listings, organization records, course information, training metadata, and links to documents hosted on Amazon Web Services.

According to CyberScoop, Schemata acknowledged the affected endpoints on May 1, 2026, after what Strix described as a 150-day disclosure process. Schemata said it remediated the issue after receiving actionable details and had no evidence that a third party exploited the vulnerability to access customer data.

=== n8n cross-issuer account takeover ===
In July 2026, Strix disclosed CVE-2026-59208, an authentication vulnerability in n8n, an open-source workflow automation platform. The National Vulnerability Database stated that the issue affected n8n instances configured with more than one trusted token-exchange issuer.

According to the NVD, affected versions resolved an external identity to a local account by using a JSON Web Token's subject (sub) claim while ignoring its issuer (iss) claim. This could allow a holder of a valid token from one trusted issuer to authenticate as a victim with the same subject identifier under another trusted issuer. The vulnerability affected releases before n8n 2.27.4 and version 2.28.0 before 2.28.1, and was fixed in versions 2.27.4 and 2.28.1.

The NVD lists the issue as CWE-287, and reports the CVSS 4.0 base score of 7.6, rated high severity.

=== Granola one-click account takeover ===
In June 2026, Strix reported a vulnerability in the Granola desktop application involving the rendering of certain in-app notifications. Granola stated that an attacker would have needed to obtain the link to an unshared private note, request access to it, and craft a profile name that rendered as a clickable link in a notification sent to a targeted user.

If the targeted user selected the link, the desktop application could be directed to an external page. Granola said that, because of the application's navigation handling at the time, the page could access the user's signed-in session and locally available data. The company said it received the report on June 23, 2026, deployed an initial server-side fix the following day, remediated a reported bypass on June 26, and received confirmation that the issue was fully resolved on June 29.

Granola said it sanitized user-controlled notification text on the server and added a desktop-app control blocking navigation to untrusted URLs. It reported no evidence of exploitation other than the researcher's proof of concept, stated that no users were affected, and said that no customer action was required.

== Use in threat reporting ==
In May 2026, Google Threat Intelligence Group reported that a suspected PRC-nexus threat actor had deployed agentic tools, including Hexstrike and Strix, against a Japanese technology firm and an East Asian cybersecurity platform. Google said the use of autonomous reconnaissance and automated verification tools suggested a shift toward AI-driven frameworks that could scale vulnerability discovery with minimal human oversight.

== See also ==
- Application security
- Dynamic application security testing
- Penetration test
- Vulnerability scanner
