= AI Action Summit 2025 =

2025 international summit in France

2025 AI Action Summit

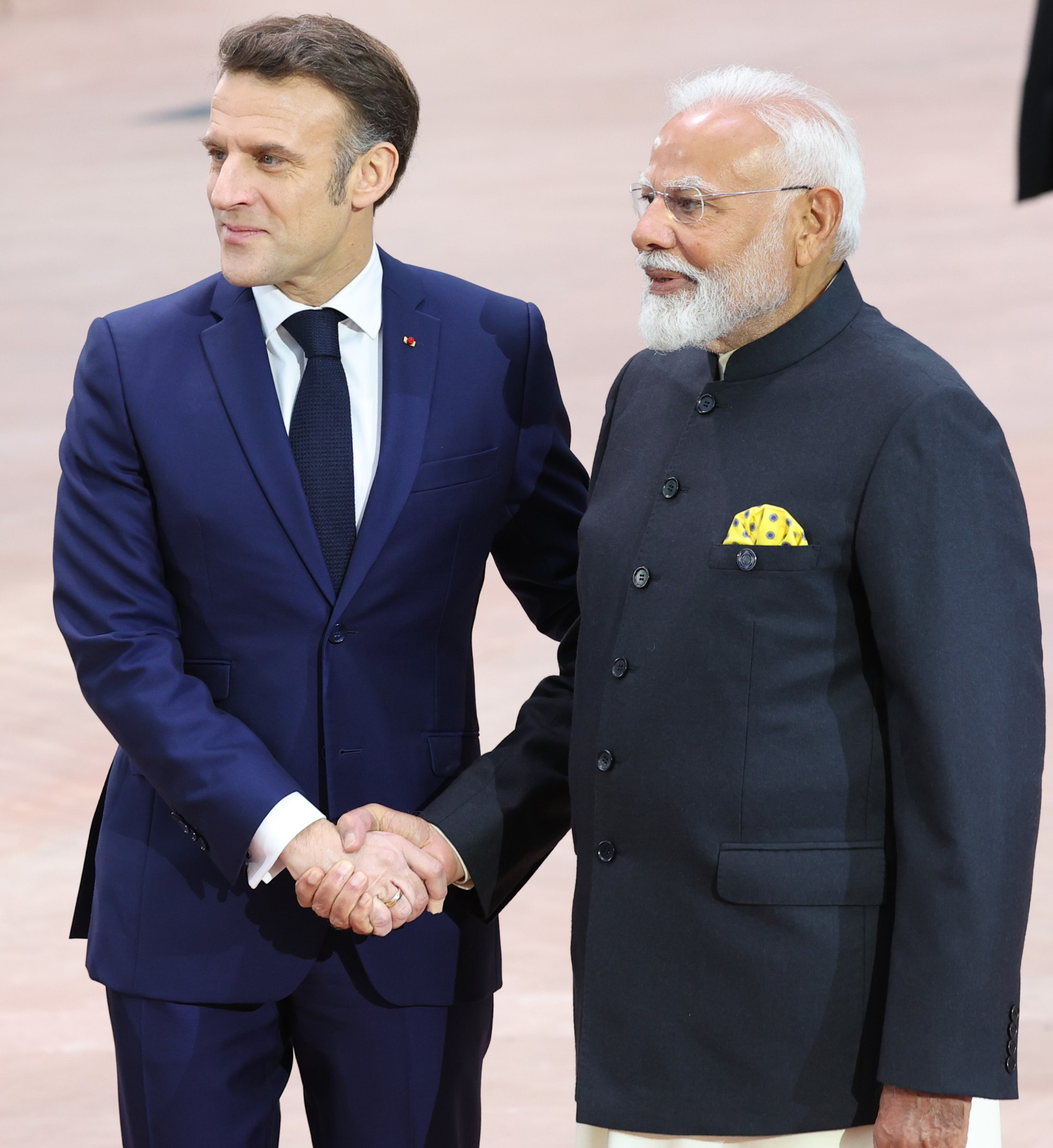
- President Macron of France with Prime Minister Modi of India
- Host country: France and India
- Date: 10–11 February 2025
- Venues: Grand Palais, Paris
- Follows: AI Seoul Summit
- Precedes: AI Impact Summit
- Website: elysee.fr

The Artificial Intelligence (AI) Action Summit (French: Sommet pour l'action sur l'intelligence artificielle or Sommet pour l'action sur l'IA, SAIA) was held at the Grand Palais in Paris, France, from 10 to 11 February 2025. The summit was co-chaired by French President Emmanuel Macron and Indian Prime Minister Narendra Modi. The 2025 AI Action Summit followed the 2023 AI Safety Summit hosted at Bletchley Park in the UK, and the 2024 AI Seoul Summit in South Korea. This series of AI summits continued with the AI Impact Summit in Delhi, which was hosted by India in February 2026.

Whereas the 2023 AI Safety Summit was attended by representatives from 29 governments and executives from only a handful of AI companies, over 1,000 participants from more than 100 countries attended the 2025 Paris AI Summit, representing government leaders, international organisations, the academic and research community, the private sector, and civil society.

== Background ==
The First International AI Safety Report was published on 29 January 2025. Commissioned after the Bletchley Park AI Safety Summit, the report focused on the risks and threats posed by general-purpose AI, and was slated for discussion at the Paris summit as part of the "Trust in AI" pillar. Whereas the first summit was focused on the catastrophic risks of AI and their mitigation, the Paris meeting was recast as an "AI Action Summit" emphasising innovation, practical implementation, and potential economic opportunities of AI, while also exploring a broader range of risks including its environmental impact and disruptions to the labour market. In the weeks leading up to the Paris summit, government leaders had also started to rally around "national champions" in AI, partly in response to Chinese AI startup DeepSeek, which had released a new model rivalling OpenAI o1.

On Sunday 9 February, French President Emmanuel Macron posted a compilation of AI-generated deepfake video clips of himself on Instagram to help publicise the start of the 2025 AI Action Summit the following day. While acknowledging the humour of the deepfakes, the real Macron states in the video that using artificial intelligence, "we can do some very big things: change healthcare, energy, life in our society".

== Proceedings ==
=== Day 1 ===
In her opening address, French special envoy Anne Bouverot discussed the environmental impact of AI, acknowledging the technology's "current trajectory is unsustainable".

General secretary Christy Hoffman of the UNI Global Union said that "AI-driven productivity gains risk turning the technology into yet another engine of inequality, further straining our democracies".

Chinese Vice Premier Zhang Guoqing made a speech expressing China's willingness "to work with other countries to promote development, safeguard security, and share achievements in the field of artificial intelligence".

Google CEO Sundar Pichai said in his speech that while the rise of AI brings many risks, "The biggest risk is missing out". He discussed Google's long track record of AI research and said that the company is investing further into "deep research" agents that can autonomously search the Internet and compile a full analysis for users.

A new coalition, the Robust Open Online Safety Tools (ROOST) initiative, debuted at the summit. Supported by Google, Discord, OpenAI, and Roblox, and incubated at the Institute of Global Politics at Columbia University, the organisation is developing free, open-source tools to detect and report child sexual abuse material (CSAM).

In his speech closing the first day, President Emmanuel Macron emphasized that France has the capability to deliver the power required by AI companies, thanks to its production of nuclear energy. While declaring that Europe was "back in the race" for AI, Macron said that the region was "too slow" for investors, and called on the EU to "simplify regulation" and "resynchronize with the rest of the world".

=== Day 2 ===
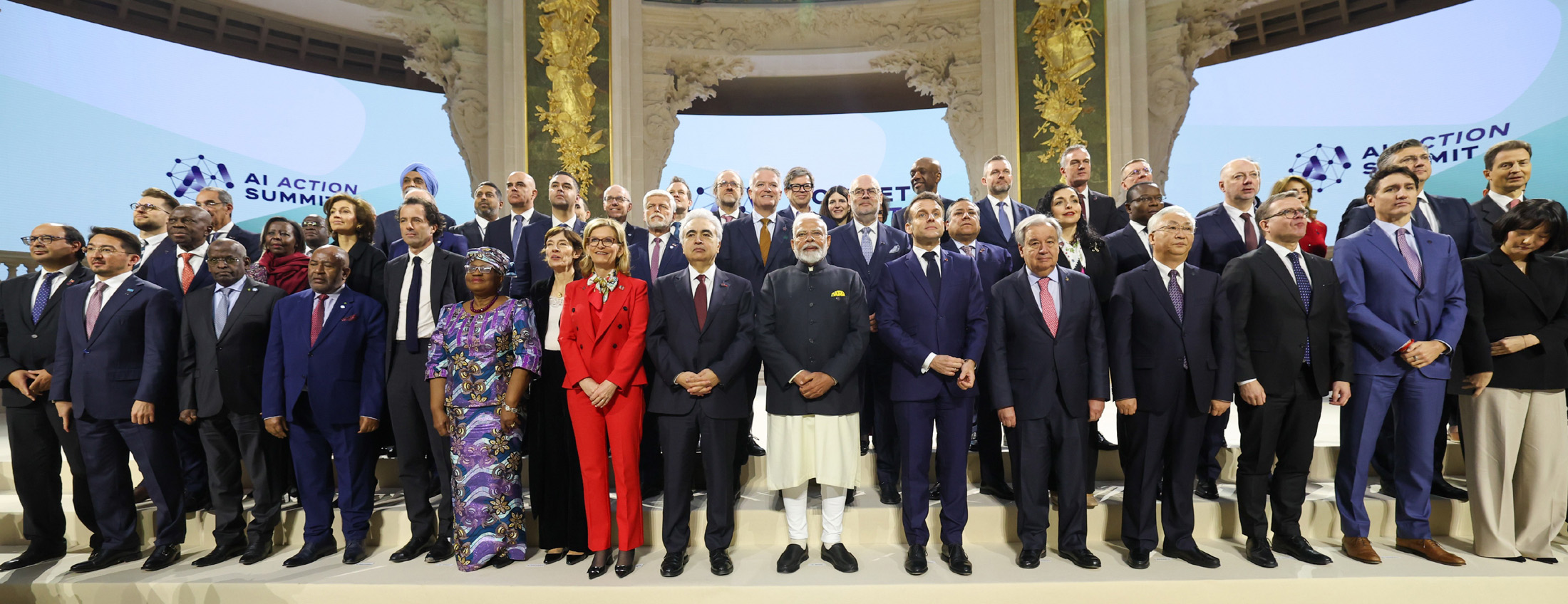
World leaders at AI Action Summit in Paris, 11 February 2025

On 11 February 2025, the French government announced its $400 million endowment of Current AI, a new foundation to support the creation of AI "public goods" including high-quality datasets and open-source tools and infrastructure. Launched by President Macron, Current AI is backed by nine governments – Finland, France, Germany, Chile, India, Kenya, Morocco, Nigeria, Slovenia, and Switzerland – plus various philanthropic organisations such as the Omidyar Group and the McGovern Foundation, and private companies such as Google and Salesforce.

Another initiative launched at the summit was the Coalition for Sustainable AI. Led by France, the UN Environment Programme (UNEP), and the International Telecommunication Union (ITU), the coalition has the support of 11 countries, five international organisations, and 37 tech companies including EDF, IBM, Nvidia, and SAP.

The Summit of Heads of State and Government took place with a plenary session in the Grand Palais. Prime Minister Narendra Modi of India stressed the need to "democratise technology" and "[ensure] access to all, especially in the Global South".

Vice President JD Vance of the United States used his speech to warn against "excessive regulation of the AI" which "could kill a transformative sector just as it's taking off". Vance also warned other leaders against cooperating with "authoritarian regimes" on AI, a comment widely interpreted as a reference to China.

== Investments ==
At the summit, the European Union made several announcements related to planned investments supporting AI development. President Ursula von der Leyen of the European Commission launched InvestAI, a €200 billion initiative, including €20 billion to build four AI gigafactories to train highly complex, very large models.

In addition, a coalition of more than 60 European companies launched the EU AI Champions Initiative. Led by venture capital firm General Catalyst, the coalition plans to invest €150 billion in AI-related businesses and infrastructure in Europe over five years.

President Emmanuel Macron announced that private investors had pledged to invest nearly €110 billion in the AI sector in France. Financing of between €30 and €50 billion is expected from the United Arab Emirates to build a very large data centre campus, with another €20 billion from the Canadian investment firm Brookfield Corporation.

French startup Mistral AI and Helsing, a German-British company, announced their partnership in developing vision-language-action models helping soldiers use AI on the battlefield.

== Reactions ==
The Financial Times editorial board noted that the Paris summit "highlighted a shift in the dynamics towards geopolitical competition", which it characterised as "a new AI arms race" between the US and China, with Europe "trying to carve out its role".

Fortune.com AI editor Jeremy Kahn described the 2025 Paris Summit as an "AI festival, complete with glitzy corporate side events and even a late night dance party", contrasting it with the "decidedly sober" mood of the inaugural AI Safety Summit at Bletchley Park.

Many experts of the AI Safety Community expressed disappointment that the Paris Summit did not do enough to address AI risks, with Anthropic CEO Dario Amodei calling it a "missed opportunity". Others voicing similar concerns included David Leslie of the Alan Turing Institute and Max Tegmark of the Future of Life Institute.

Reporting from Paris, technology columnist Kevin Roose of The New York Times wrote, "The biggest surprise of the Paris summit, for me, has been that policymakers can't seem to grasp how soon powerful AI systems could arrive, or how disruptive they could be."

== Statement on inclusive and sustainable AI ==
At the summit, 58 countries, including France, China, and India, signed a joint declaration, the Statement on Inclusive and Sustainable Artificial Intelligence for People and the Planet. The statement outlines general principles such as accessibility and overcoming the digital divide; developing AI that is open, transparent, ethical, safe, and trustworthy; avoiding market concentration of AI development to encourage innovation; positive outcomes for labour markets; making AI sustainable; and promoting international cooperation and governance.

The US and UK refused to sign the declaration on inclusive and sustainable AI. The UK government said in a brief statement that the international agreement did not go far enough in defining global governance of AI and addressing concerns about its impact on national security.

=== Signatories ===
The list of signatory countries to the statement for inclusive and sustainable AI in alphabetical order:

- Armenia
- Australia
- Austria
- Belgium
- Brazil
- Bulgaria
- Cambodia
- Canada
- Chile
- China
- Croatia
- Cyprus
- Czechia
- Denmark
- Djibouti
- Estonia
- Finland
- France
- Germany
- Greece
- Hungary
- India
- Indonesia
- Ireland
- Italy
- Japan
- Kazakhstan
- Kenya
- Latvia
- Lithuania
- Luxembourg
- Malta
- Mexico
- Monaco
- Morocco
- New Zealand
- Nigeria
- Norway
- Poland
- Portugal
- Romania
- Rwanda
- Senegal
- Serbia
- Singapore
- Slovakia
- Slovenia
- South Africa
- South Korea
- Spain
- Sweden
- Switzerland
- Thailand
- Netherlands
- United Arab Emirates
- Ukraine
- Uruguay
- Vatican

Additional signatories included the following international bodies and research institutes:

- ALAI (Latin American Association on Internet)
- African Union (AU) Commission
- BEUC The European Consumer Organisation
- Center for Democracy and Technology
- Council of Europe
- European Commission (and the 27 member states)
- Hugging Face
- INRIA
- Institute of Advanced Study
- OECD
- Partnership on AI
- PMIA
- Sciences Po
- UN
- UNESCO

== Global AI Summit series ==
Global AI Summit series
Year	Name	Location	Host
2023	AI Safety Summit	Bletchley Park, United Kingdom	United Kingdom
2024	AI Seoul Summit	Seoul, South Korea	South Korea
2025	AI Action Summit	Paris, France	France
2026	AI Impact Summit	New Delhi, India	India
2027	AI Summit	Geneva, Switzerland	Switzerland
