= Asmoli =

- Location within Uttar Pradesh Location within India
- Coordinates: 28.43°N 78.32°E
- Country: India
- State: Uttar Pradesh
- District: Sambhal

Government
  - MLA: Shrimati Pinki Singh Yadav
- Time zone: UTC+5:30 (IST)
- PIN: 244304
- Telephone code: (+91) (05923)
- Vehicle registration: UP 38 Old registration = UP 21 (Till 2011)

Asmoli is a village in Sambhal district of Uttar Pradesh state, India. It belongs to Moradabad Division. In 2011, Asmoli had 7.273 inhabitants. It is located 32 kilometres (20 mi) west of Moradabad District and 366 kilometres (227 mi) from the state capital of Lucknow. Asmoli is part of Sambhal Tehsil and surrounded by Joya Tehsil towards North, Kundarki Tehsil towards East and Pawansa Tehsil towards South. Chandausi, Sambhal, Amroha, Moradabad are the nearby cities to Asmoli. The village gives its name to the Asmoli Assembly constituency.

== Education ==
=== Primary school ===
- Kishan Inter College
- Kasturba Gandhi Balika Vidhyalaya
- Rukmani Devi S.V.M.(JHS)
- P.S Public School
- Adarsh Inter College
- Sarsavti Sisu Mandir School
- Dr B. R. Ambedkar Public School
- Vijay Kumar Junior Public School
- S. P. Krishna Uttar Madyamic

=== College ===
- Shree K.S Degree College
- Roshan Singh Chauhan Smarak Mahavidyalaya, Asmoli
- Durga Mahavidyalaya, Khaspur Lodhipur, Asmoli
- Shaheen Smarak Mahavidyalaya, Manota, Chaudharpur Road, Asmoli
