= Gulabo Devi =

Indian politician

Minister of state (independent charge), Secondary Education Government of Uttar Pradesh
- Incumbent
- Assumed office 25 March 2022
- Chief Minister: Yogi Adityanath
- Preceded by: Dinesh Sharma

Member of the Uttar Pradesh Legislative Assembly
- Incumbent
- Assumed office 2017
- Preceded by: Laxmi Gautam
- Constituency: Chandausi
- In office 1996–2007
- Preceded by: Karan Singh
- Succeeded by: Girish Chandra
- Constituency: Chandausi

Personal details
- Born: Gulab; 1 June 1955 (age 71) Chandausi, Uttar Pradesh
- Party: Bharatiya Janata Party
- Spouse: Ram Pal Singh
- Children: 3 daughters
- Parent: Babu Ram Savitri Devi
- Education: Rohilkhand university
- Occupation: MLA
- Profession: Politician {lecturer in political science}

Gulab Devi is an Indian politician and a member of Uttar Pradesh Legislative Assembly of India. She represents the Chandausi of Sambhal of Uttar Pradesh. She is the current Minister of State (Independent charge) of Secondary Education in the Government of Uttar Pradesh.

She was appointed lecturer in political science and later became principal in Bhartiya municipal girls inter college Chandausi district Sambhal.

== Political career ==
Gulab Devi contested Uttar Pradesh Assembly Election as Bharatiya Janata Party candidate and defeated her close contestant Vimlesh Kumari from Indian National Congress by a margin of 45,469 votes. She was state vice president of Bhartiya Janta Party from 2008 to 2012. She spent two separate terms as Member of legislative Assembly of Chandausi Uttar Pradesh. She was the Minister of state (women welfare, child development and pustahar) in Uttar Pradesh government from 2017 to 2022 Bharatiya Janata Party.

== Posts held ==
#	From	To	Position	Comments
01	2017	2022	Member, 17th Legislative Assembly	
02	2022	Incumbent	Member, 18th Uttar Pradesh Assembly	
03	2022	Incumbent	MOS (Independent Charge), Secondary Education, Government of Uttar Pradesh	
