= Dudhapur =

Dudhapur is a village near Bahjoi in Bhimnagar district of Uttar Pradesh state of India.
