= Narauli =

- Town
- Location in Uttar Pradesh, India Narauli (India)
- Coordinates: 28°29′06″N 78°42′44″E
- Country: India
- State: Uttar Pradesh
- District: Sambhal

Government
  - Chairman: Bittan Malik (samajwadi party)
- Elevation: 186 m (610 ft)

Population (2011)
  - Total: 18,346

Languages
  - Official: Hindi
- Time zone: UTC+5:30 (IST)
- Vehicle registration: UP-38
- Website: up.gov.in

Narauli is a town and a nagar panchayat in Sambhal district in the Indian state of Uttar Pradesh.

== History ==
Narauli is an old settlement associated with the Bargujars, and it served as the seat of a pargana at least since the time of Akbar: it is mentioned in the Ain-i-Akbari as being part of the sarkar of Sambhal, producing a revenue of 1,408,098 dams for the imperial treasury and a force of 400 infantry and 50 cavalry to the Mughal army. By the turn of the 20th century, Narauli was described as consisting of two parts: Makhupura (named after Makhu Singh, an ancestor of the ruling family) and Qazi Muhalla (named after the main civic qazi official of the pargana). It was a compact town on both sides of the road from Sambhal to Chandausi, and it was surrounded by extensive mango groves, especially on the south and west. Markets were held twice weekly, and there were several mosques and temples in the town. The ruins of an old fort were also visible.

== Geography ==
Narauli has an average elevation of 186 metres (610 feet).

== Demographics ==
As of 2001 India census, Narauli had a population of 16,682. Males constitute 53% of the population and females 47%. Narauli has an average literacy rate of 25%, lower than the national average of 59.5%: male literacy is 31%, and female literacy is 18%. In Narauli, 19% of the population is under 6 years of age.
