= Government Girls Post Graduate College, Rampur =

Coordinates: 28.812262°N 79.025069°E

Govt Girls PG College
- Type: Govt College (UP State Government)
- Established: 1976
- Parent institution: M. J. P. Rohilkhand University
- Location: [[Rampur, Punjab|Rampur]], Uttar Pradesh, India
- Website: www.ggpgcrampur.com

Govt Girls PG College is an institute located in Rampur, Uttar Pradesh, India. Students are studies in Arts & Commerce mainly. The institute is located inside Rampur Fort complex. It is affiliated with M.J.P. Rohilkhand University and is accredited by National Assessment and Accreditation Council (NAAC), an autonomous body funded by University Grants Commission (UGC) of Government of India.

== History ==
Govt Girls PG College was established in the year 1976. The college campus is spread over a huge area inside Rampur Fort (Quilla). The building was originally the residence of Nawabs of Rampur. It was converted into a college during the reign of Nawab Murtaza Ali Khan. The famous Raza Library is also located nearby in the same Fort complex. ..................................................................................................................................................

== Infrastructure ==
The college campus has administrative office, faculty buildings, classrooms, sports grounds, hall and library. It also houses an ancient swimming pool made of marble in the middle of the campus. Various sports events are conducted regularly in the sports grounds. The annual cultural event takes place in the multipurpose hall.

== Programmes ==
The college offers undergraduate and postgraduate degrees in the following programmes

=== Undergraduate ===
- Bachelor of Arts (B.A) in English, Sanskrit, Persian, Political Science, Hindu, Urdu, Economics, Sociology, Psychology, Music.
- Bachelor of Commerce (B.Com.)

=== Postgraduate ===
- Master of Arts (M.A) in English, Sanskrit, Persian, Political Science, Hindu, Urdu, Economics, Sociology, Psychology, Music.
