= Turning into Stone rumour (2012) =

Indian rumour

Turning into Stone
- Status: Inactive
- Genre: Rumour
- Begins: 2 January 2012; 14 years ago
- Location: North India
- Country: India
- Years active: 2012 and 2020
- Inaugurated: January 2012
- Most recent: March 2020

Turning into Stone (Hindi: पत्थर बनने की अफवाह) was a rumour in north-India which came in the year of January 2012.

According this rumour if you sleep you will turn into stone. This rumour affected many people's lives, during this rumour people used to stay awake till dawn. On Monday, 2 January 2012 this news came from Kanpur and its neighbour cities.

The main culprit in the quick spreading of the rumour was mobile phones, as people called their relatives, neighbourhood, friends, telling them not to sleep as that would to turn into stone.

In March 2020 during one day voluntary public curfew lockdown in India. This rumours again blows in Rampur, Uttar Pradesh and people got out from their homes and discussed about this rumour.
