= Chandausi Assembly constituency =

Constituency of the Uttar Pradesh legislative assembly in India

Coordinates: 28.46°N 78.77°E

Chandausi
- Constituency No. 31 for the Uttar Pradesh Legislative Assembly

Constituency details
- Country: India
- Region: North India
- State: Uttar Pradesh
- District: Sambhal
- Lok Sabha constituency: Sambhal
- Total electors: 383,406

Member of Legislative Assembly
- 18th Uttar Pradesh Legislative Assembly
- Incumbent Gulab Devi
- Party: Bharatiya Janata Party
- Elected year: 2017

Chandausi is one of the 403 Legislative Assembly constituencies of Uttar Pradesh state in India.

Chandausi is reserved for candidates belonging to the Scheduled Castes. It is one of four Uttar Pradesh Legislative Assembly constituencies in Sambhal district (the other three being Sambhal, Asmoli and Gunnaur).

== Members of Legislative Assembly ==
Year	Member	Party
1962	Narendra Singh	Independent
1967	Indra Mohani	Indian National Congress
1969	Indra Mohani	Indian National Congress
1974	Devi Singh	Bharatiya Kranti Dal
1977	Karan Singh	Janata Party
1980	Jiraj Singh Moria	Indian National Congress (I)
1985	Phool Kunwars	Indian National Congress
1989	Karan Singh	Bharatiya Janata Party
1991	Gulab Devi	Bharatiya Janata Party
1993	Karan Singh	Samajwadi Party
1996	Gulab Devi	Bharatiya Janata Party
2002	Gulab Devi	Bharatiya Janata Party
2007	Girish Chandra	Bahujan Samaj Party
2012	Laxmi Gautam	Samajwadi Party
2017	Gulab Devi	Bharatiya Janata Party
2022	Gulab Devi	Bharatiya Janata Party

== Election results ==
=== 2027 ===
2027 Uttar Pradesh Legislative Assembly election: Chandausi
Party	Candidate	Votes	%	±%
INDIA				
NDA				
BSP				
NOTA	None of the above			
Majority				
Turnout				
gain from		Swing		

=== 2022 ===
2022 Uttar Pradesh Legislative Assembly election: Chandausi
Party	Candidate	Votes	%	±%
BJP	Gulab Devi	112,890	49.53	▲2.76
SP	Vimlesh Kumari	111,523	44.01	
BSP	Ranvijay Singh	30,481	3.37	▼9.41
NOTA	None of the above	2,059	0.9	▼0.06
Majority		1,367	5.52	▼14.77
Turnout		227,934	59.45	▼2.2
BJP hold		Swing		

=== 2017 ===
Uttar Pradesh Legislative Assembly Election, 2017: Chandausi
Party	Candidate	Votes	%	±%
BJP	Gulab Devi	104,806	46.77	
INC	Vimlesh Kumari	59,337	26.48	
BSP	Virmawati Devi	51,049	22.78	
MD	Jyotasna Sagar	3,615	1.61	
NOTA	None of the above	2,135	0.96	
Majority		45,469	20.29	
Turnout		224,074	61.65	
BJP gain from SP		Swing		

== See also ==
- List of constituencies of the Uttar Pradesh Legislative Assembly
- Sambhal district
