= Tisotra =

Tisostra
- Village
- Location in Bijnor Uttar Pradesh, India Tisostra (India)
- Coordinates: 29.6196045°N 78.1535581°E
- Country: India
- State: Uttar Pradesh
- Bijnor: Bijnor

Government
  - Type: Panchayat raj
  - Body: Gram panchayat
- Elevation: 269 m (883 ft)

Population (2011)
  - Total: 3,921
- Sex ratio 1000/924 ♂/♀

Languages
  - Official: Hindi
- Time zone: UTC+5:30 (IST)
- PIN: 246723
- Telephone: 01341
- ISO 3166 code: IN-UP
- Vehicle registration: UP 20 XXXX
- Website: https://bijnor.nic.in/

Tisotra is a village that is governed by Panchayat law in the Bijnor district of the Indian state of Uttar Pradesh. There is a Grameen Bal sadan inter college and three government primary school. The population as of 2011 was estimated at 3,921.

== Geography ==
It belongs to the Moradabad division and is situated 26 km from sub-district headquarter Najibabad and 61 km from district headquarter Bijnor. It is approximately 269 meter above sea level.

== Economy ==
The main activities of this village include cane plants, cane crushers, brickworks, wood-razing and bakeries.

== Nearby villages ==
• Keshopur • Dungarpur • Barkatpur • Lalpur Man • Sabalpur

== Education ==
It has a government-run primary and junior school & Grameen bal sadan inter college
