= Pinki Singh =

Pinki Singh may refer to:

- Pinki Singh Yadav, Indian politician
- Pinki Singh (bowls)
