= Pawansa =

- Location within Uttar Pradesh
- Coordinates: 28.28°N 78.34°E
- Country: India
- State: Uttar Pradesh
- District: Sambhal
- Time zone: UTC+5:30 (IST)
- PIN: 244302
- Telephone code: (+91) (05923)
- Vehicle registration: UP 38 Old registration = UP 21 (Till 2011)

Pawansa is a block of Sambhal district Uttar Pradesh state, India. It belongs to Moradabad Division. It is located 45 km from District Moradabad. 360 km from the State capital, Lucknow.
