= Teerthanker Mahaveer University =

Private University in Moradabad, Uttar Pradesh, India

Coordinates: 28.8247°N 78.6581°E

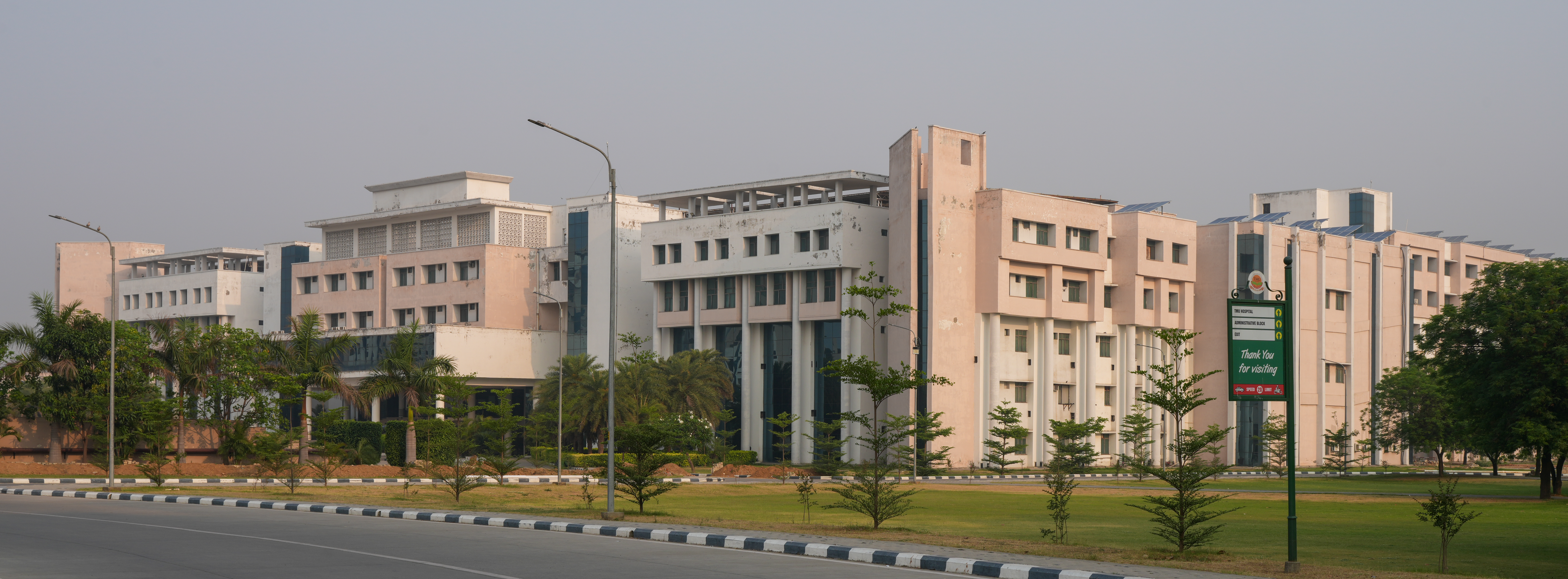
- College of Engineering, TMU
- Motto: Right Philosophy, Right Knowledge, Right Conduct.
- Type: Jain Minority Private University
- Established: 2008
- Chancellor: Suresh Jain
- Vice-Chancellor: Dr. V. K. Jain
- Location: Moradabad, Uttar Pradesh, India
- Campus: 130 acres (53 ha)
- Website: www.tmu.ac.in

Teerthanker Mahaveer University, also known as TMU, is a private university in Moradabad, Uttar Pradesh, India, established in 2008.

== History ==
TMU was established in 2008 by the Government of Uttar Pradesh Act No.30 and approved by the University Grants Commission (UGC) under Section 2 (f) and 12 (B) of the UGC Act, 1956.

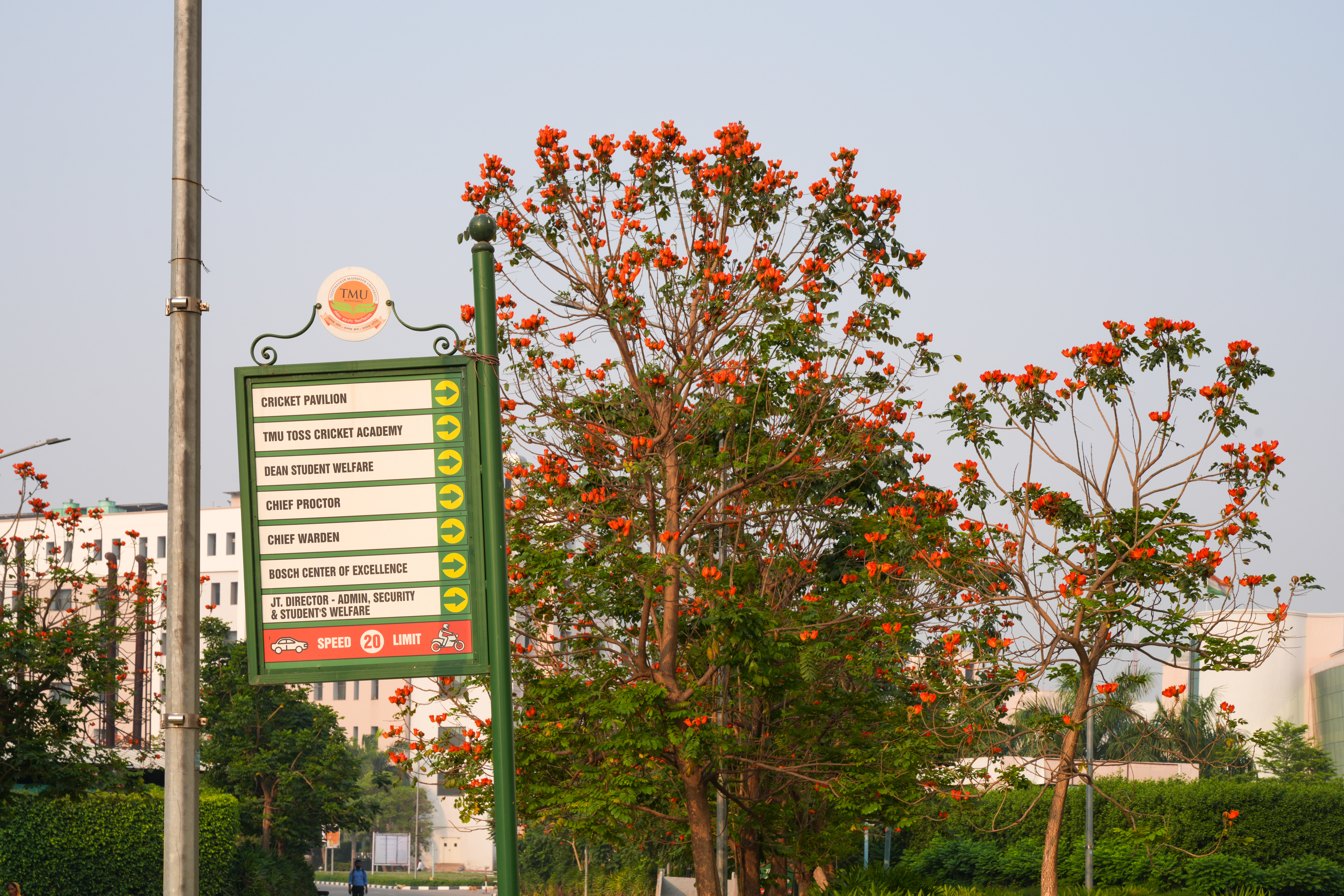
Flowering trees in early summer

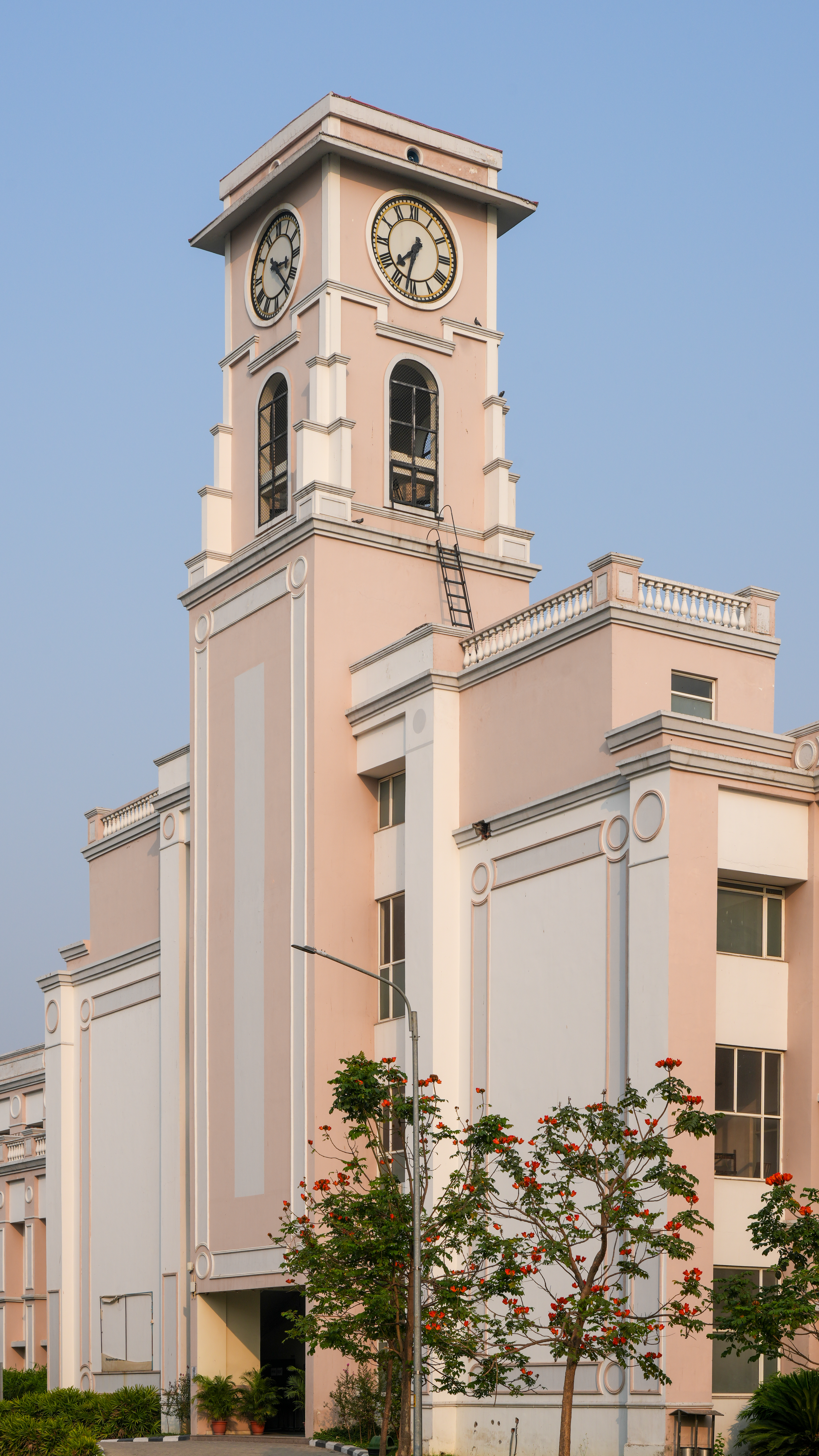
Clock tower

Spread over 130+ acres TMU has a well-equipped campus with 15 on-campus academic units, including colleges, departments and centres, that include an 800+ bed super specialty hospital, indoor and outdoor stadium, gymnasium, auditorium, and hostels.

== Academics ==
TMU offers career-oriented programmes at all levels, i.e., UG, PG, and doctoral degrees across diverse streams.

== Rankings ==
In 2023, TMU was ranked 45th among the top 50 Universities in India in a survey by Outlook (Indian magazine). TMU has received accreditation from ASSOCHAM, NAAC and ICAR among others in recent years.

== Notable alumni ==
- Pinki Singh Yadav, (Member of Uttar Pradesh Legislative assembly)
