= Rampur, Uttar Pradesh =

Rampur Rāmapura Mustafabad
- City
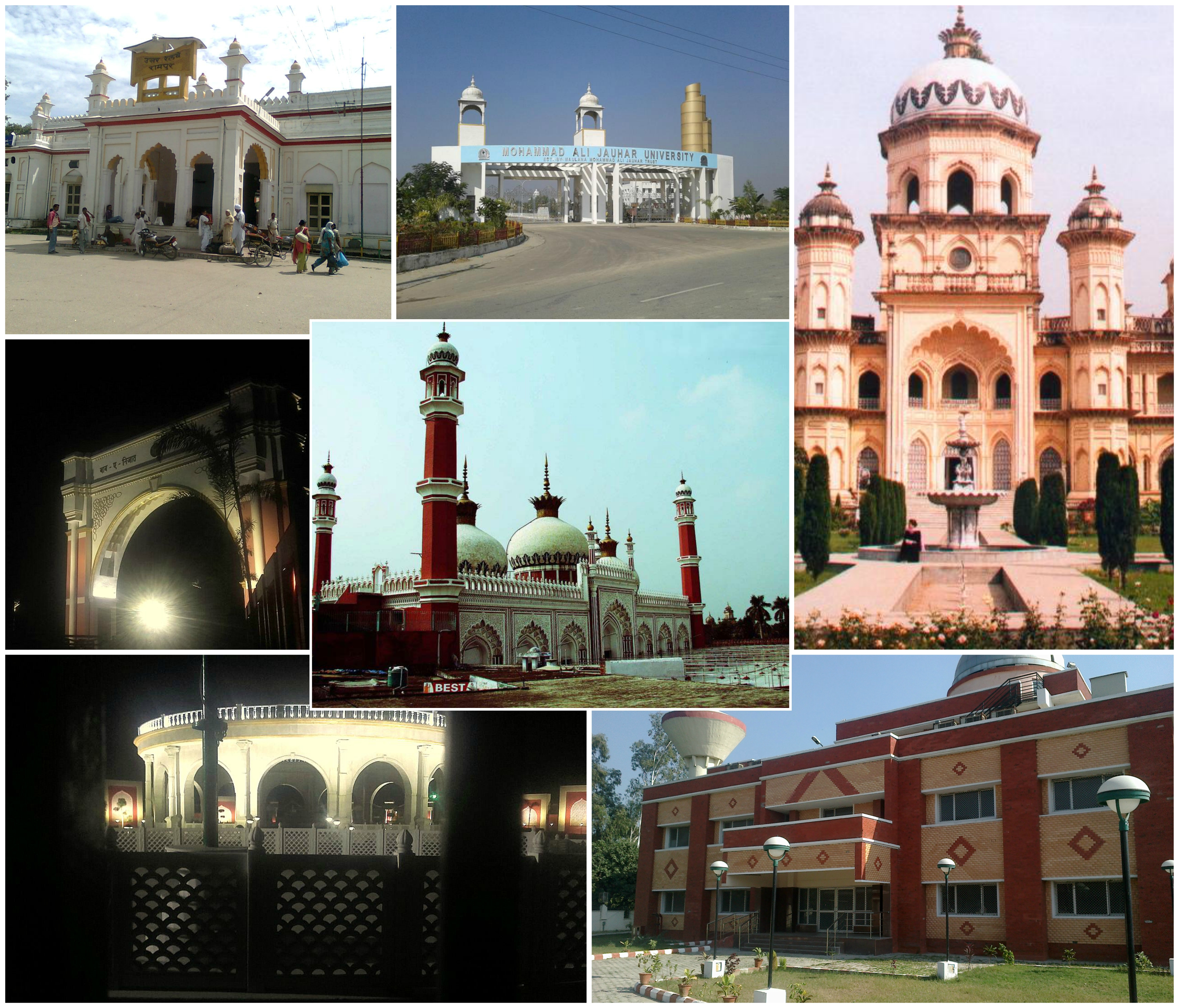
- Center: Jama Masjid Rampur, Clockwise from top : Rampur Railway Station; Mohammad Ali Jauhar University; Rampur Raza Library; Aryabhatt Planetarium; Gandhi Samadhi

- Location in Uttar Pradesh, India Rampur (India)
- Coordinates: 28.8°N 79.0°E
- Country: India
- State: Uttar Pradesh
- District: Rampur
- Region: Rohilkhand
- Division: Moradabad
- Named for: Ram Singh I

Government
  - Body: Rampur Nagar Palika Parishad
  - MP: Mohibbullah Nadvi (SP)
  - MLA: Akash Saxena (BJP)
  - Zila Panchayat Chairman: Khyaliram Lodhi (BJP)

Area
  - Total: 84 km^{2} (32 sq mi)
  - Rank: 43
- Elevation: 288 m (945 ft)

Population (2011)
  - Total: 325,248
  - Density: 3,900/km^{2} (10,000/sq mi)

Language
  - Official: Hindi
  - Additional official: Urdu
- Time zone: UTC+5:30 (IST)
- PIN: 244901
- Telephone code: 0595
- Vehicle registration: UP-22
- Sex ratio: 1000/927 ♂/♀
- Literacy: 55.08%
- Civic agency: Rampur Nagar Palika Parisad
- Distance from Delhi: 186 kilometres (116 mi) NW (land)
- Distance from Lucknow: 322 kilometres (200 mi) SE (land)
- Governing body: Government of UP; Government of India
- Website: rampur.nic.in

Rampur (/ˈrɑːmpʊər/; ISO: Rāmapura; formerly Mustafabad) is a city and the administrative headquarters of Rampur district in the Indian state of Uttar Pradesh. It was formerly known for industries such as sugar refining and cotton milling. The Raza Library houses more than 12,000 rare manuscripts along with a notable collection of Mughal miniature paintings. Rampur is located about 322 kilometres north-west of the state capital Lucknow and approximately 180 kilometres from the national capital New Delhi.

In 2007, the Ministry of Minority Affairs identified Rampur district as one of the 14 'Minority Concentration Districts' in Uttar Pradesh, on the basis of the 2001 Census data relating to population, socio-economic indicators, and basic amenities. The city is also known for the Rampuri knife (chaaku), commonly known as the Rampuri.

== Etymology ==
The area originally comprised four villages known as Kather, associated with Raja Ram Singh. In the 18th century, Nawab Faizullah Khan of the Rohilla dynasty proposed renaming the settlement to Faizabad. However, since several other places were already known by that name, it was instead named Mustafabad, later also referred to as Rampur.

== History ==
According to medieval history, Rampur was part of the Delhi region and was divided between Badaun and Sambhal districts. Being situated in the upper part of Rohilkhand, it was known as Kather and was ruled by the Katheria Rajputs. The Katheria Rajputs resisted external powers for about 400 years, fighting the Sultans of Delhi and later the Mughals. They engaged in repeated battles with Nasiruddin Mahmud in 1253, Ghiyas ud din Balban in 1256, Jalal-ud-din Khalji in 1290, Firuz Shah Tughlaq in 1379, and Sikandar Lodi in 1494.

During the early Mughal period, the capital of Rohilkhand shifted from Badaun to Bareilly, which increased Rampur's importance.

Flag of Rampur State

The Rohilla War of 1774–1775 began when the Rohilla Pathans, then dominant in the region, reneged on a debt owed to the Nawab of Oudh for military assistance against the Marathas in 1772. The Rohillas were defeated and driven from their former capital, Bareilly, by the Nawab with support from troops of the British East India Company, lent by Warren Hastings.

The Rohilla state of Rampur was established by Nawab Faizullah Khan on 7 October 1774 in the presence of British commander Colonel Champion. It remained a princely state under British protection thereafter.

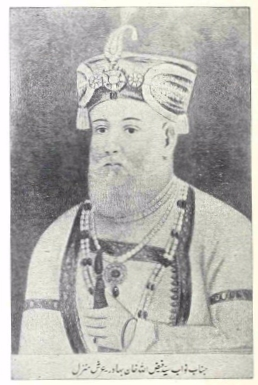
Faizullah Khan

Faizullah Khan laid the foundation of the new fort at Rampur, and the city was founded in 1775. The area originally comprised four villages known as Kather, associated with Raja Ram Singh. The first Nawab proposed renaming the settlement Faizabad, but as several places with that name already existed, it was renamed Mustafabad, later also called Rampur. Nawab Faizullah Khan ruled for 20 years. A patron of scholarship, he began the collection of Arabic, Persian, Turkish and Urdu manuscripts that now form the core of the Rampur Raza Library. After his death, his son Muhammad Ali Khan succeeded him but was killed by Rohilla leaders after 24 days. Ghulam Muhammad Khan, the deceased's brother, was proclaimed Nawab. The East India Company objected to his rule, and after three months and 22 days he was defeated by Company forces. The Governor-General then appointed Ahmad Ali Khan, son of the late Muhammad Ali Khan, as Nawab. He ruled for 44 years. With no sons, succession passed to Muhammad Sa'id Khan, son of Ghulam Muhammad Khan. Sa'id Khan raised a regular army, established courts, and carried out measures to improve the condition of farmers. He was succeeded by his son Muhammad Yusuf Ali Khan, and later by Kalb Ali Khan in 1865.

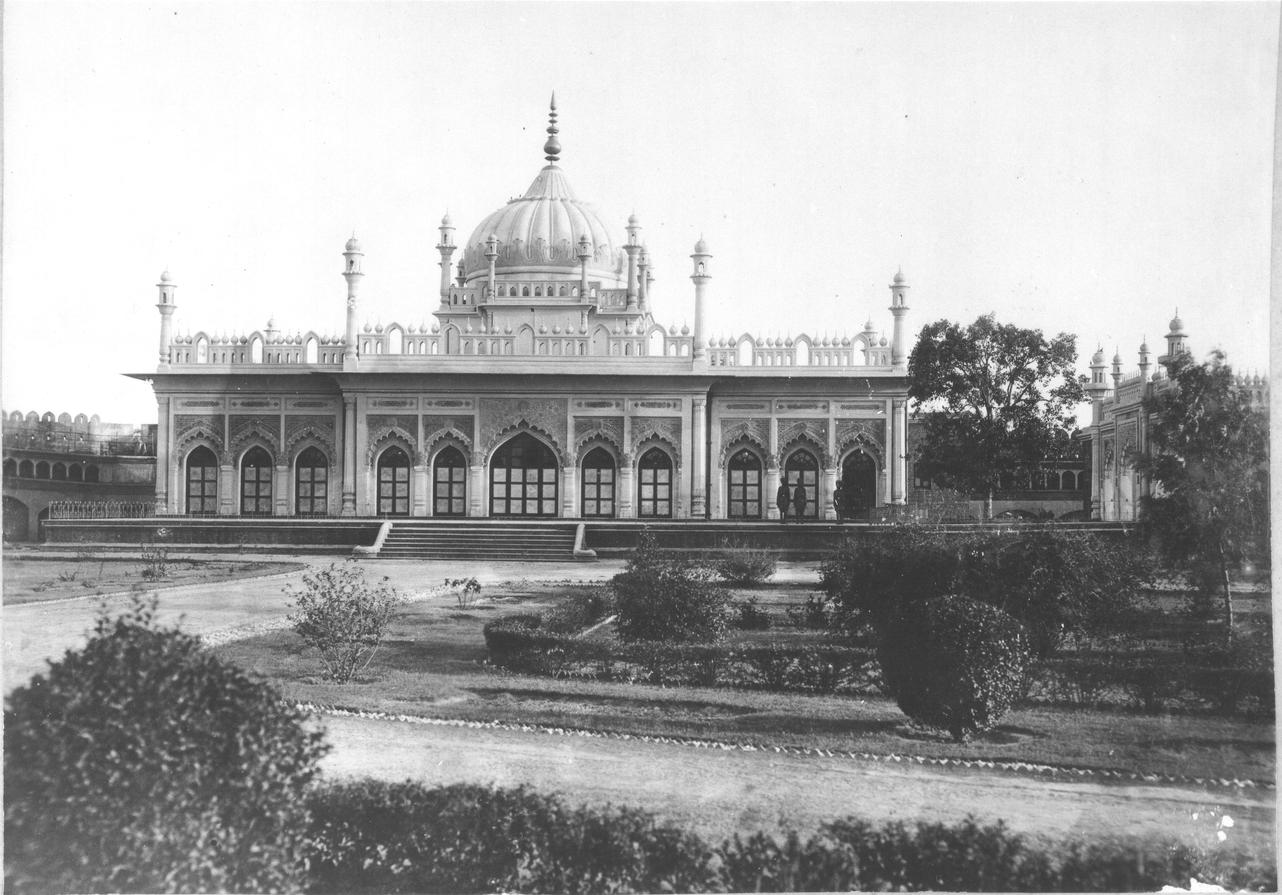
Imambara, Fort of Rampur, Uttar Pradesh, ca.1911.

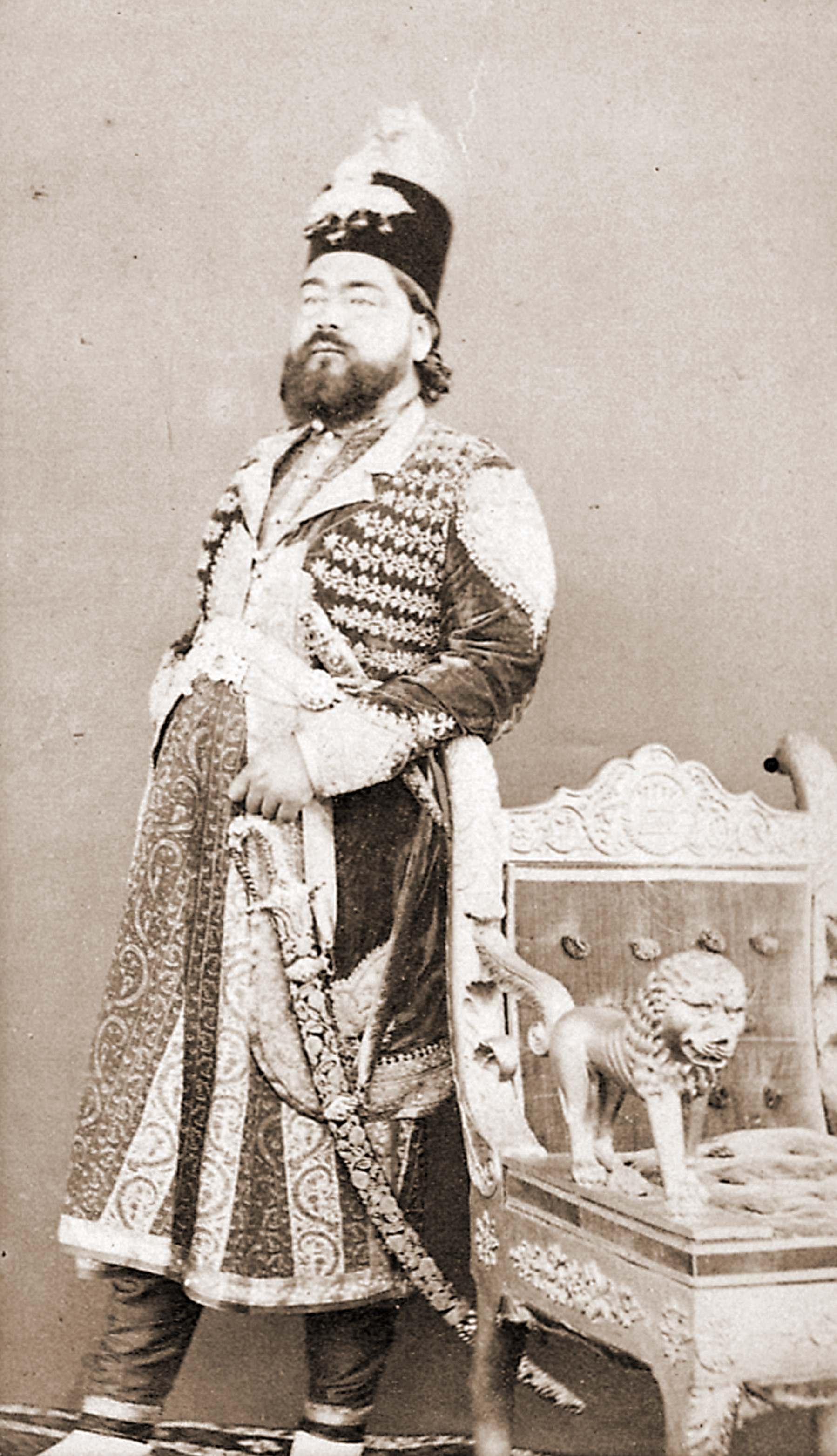
Sir Kalb Ali Khan, Nawab of Rampur (1832–1887)

Nawab Kalb Ali Khan was proficient in Arabic and Persian. Under his rule, Rampur saw progress in education. He was also a Member of Council during the viceroyalty of Lord John Lawrence. He commissioned the construction of the Jama Masjid in Rampur at a cost of Rs. 300,000 and was knighted in Agra by the Prince of Wales. He ruled for 22 years and seven months and was succeeded by his son Mushtaq Ali Khan, who appointed W. C. Wright as Chief Engineer and oversaw the construction of new buildings and canals. Nawab Hamid Ali assumed power in 1889 at the age of 14. During his reign, new schools were established, and financial contributions were made to various colleges, including a donation of Rs. 50,000 to Lucknow Medical College. In 1905 he built the Darbar Hall within the Fort, which today houses the Rampur Raza Library's collection of Oriental manuscripts. His son, Raza Ali Khan, became the last ruling Nawab in 1930.

On 1 July 1949, the State of Rampur was merged into the Republic of India. Today, many of the Nawabs' palaces, gates, and fort walls show signs of decay, though the Library continues as a flourishing institution of scholarly importance.

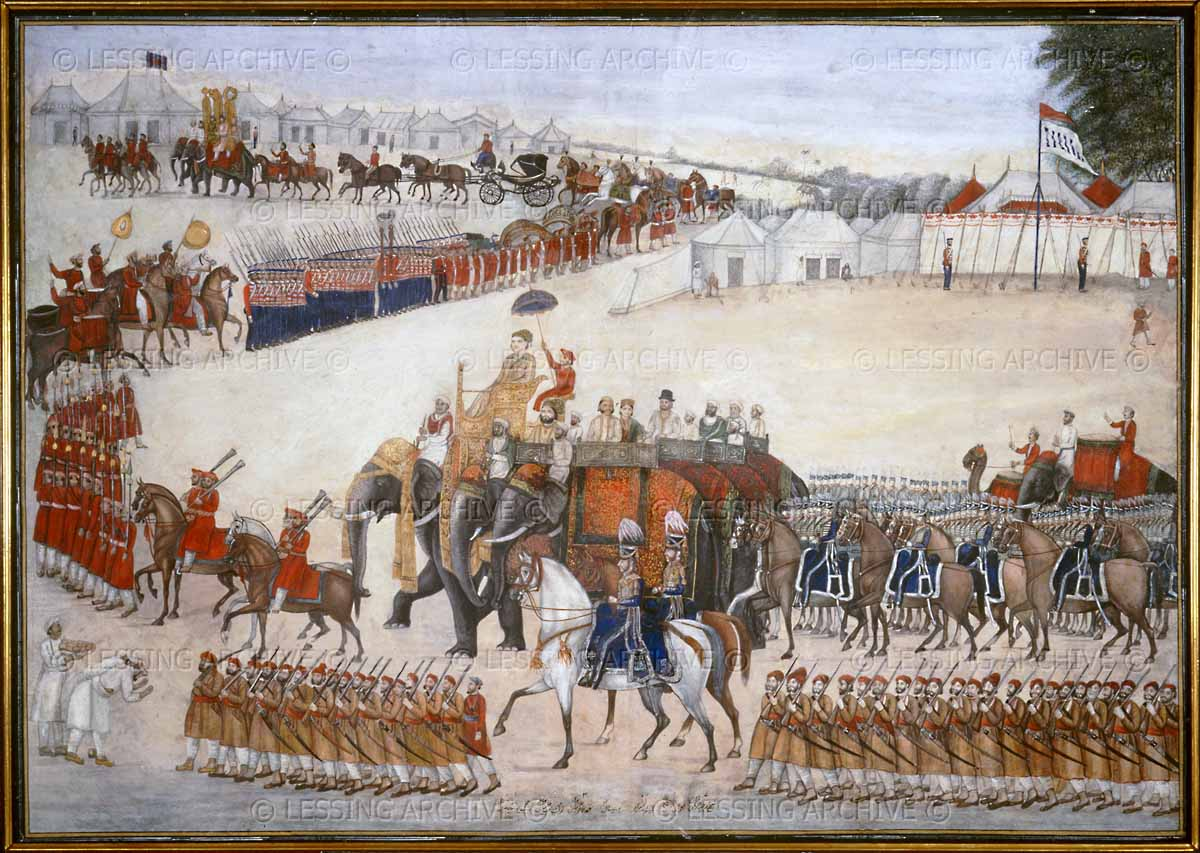
Nawab Yusef Ali Khan and his family escorted by Rampur and British troops to the encampment of Lord Canning

The Nawabs of Rampur sided with the British during the Indian Rebellion of 1857, which enabled them to retain influence in the social, political, and cultural life of northern India, particularly among Muslims of the United Provinces. Rampur also provided refuge to literary figures from the court of Bahadur Shah Zafar.

=== Post-independence ===
Descendants of the Nawabs include Murad Mian, the first child of Murtaza Ali Khan of Rampur, and Begum Noor Bano, widow of former Nawab's younger brother and ex-MP Zulfiquar Ali Khan of Rampur. Begum Noor Bano entered politics and was elected from Rampur parliamentary constituency in 1999, though she lost subsequent elections in 2004 and 2009 from Rampur and in 2014 from Moradabad. Murtaza Ali Khan and Zulfiquar Ali Khan (also known as Mikki Mia), who continued to use the title of Nawab ceremonially after independence and the abolition of princely states, are now deceased. Murtaza Ali contested an election from Rampur in 1972 against his mother Rafat Jamani Begum and won. Although the two brothers were political rivals, they never contested directly against each other. The family was later involved in smuggling scandals, some linked to Pakistan, where one of Murtaza Ali's sons had married. Raza Inter College, Hamid Inter College, and Murtaza Inter College are among the institutions named after three Nawabs.

The current titular Nawab of Rampur is Muhammad Murad Ali Khan Bahadur, eldest son of Murtaza Ali Khan Bahadur. He succeeded his father in 1982. From 1993 to 2002 he served as a member of the Raza Library Board in Rampur.

== Geography ==
Rampur, located at 28°48′N latitude and 79°05′E longitude, is part of the Moradabad division of Uttar Pradesh, India. It is bounded by Udham Singh Nagar district to the north, Bareilly district to the east, Moradabad district to the west, and Badaun district to the south. Covering an area of 2,367 km^{2}, Rampur lies at an elevation of 192 metres above sea level in the north and 166.4 metres in the south. The district has extensive agricultural land. During the monsoon, after prolonged rainfall, the mountain ranges of Nainital are visible towards the north.

=== Climate ===
In summer, temperatures generally range between 30 °C and 43 °C, while in winter they range between 3 °C and 25 °C.

Climate data for Rampur
Month	Jan	Feb	Mar	Apr	May	Jun	Jul	Aug	Sep	Oct	Nov	Dec	Year
Mean daily maximum °C (°F)	17.1 (62.8)	20.5 (68.9)	25.6 (78.1)	32.4 (90.3)	31.4 (88.5)	31.7 (89.1)	29.5 (85.1)	29.4 (84.9)	29.1 (84.4)	27.8 (82.0)	24.7 (76.5)	20 (68)	26.16 (79.09)
Mean daily minimum °C (°F)	7 (45)	9.1 (48.4)	11.2 (52.2)	15.7 (60.3)	17.4 (63.3)	17.7 (63.9)	19.2 (66.6)	21.5 (70.7)	19.2 (66.6)	13.2 (55.8)	12.1 (53.8)	8 (46)	15.58 (60.04)
Average precipitation mm (inches)	18.2 (0.72)	24.5 (0.96)	12.1 (0.48)	12.4 (0.49)	21.6 (0.85)	111.1 (4.37)	198.1 (7.80)	227.1 (8.94)	99.3 (3.91)	27.1 (1.07)	6.1 (0.24)	9.0 (0.35)	766.6 (30.18)
Source: WWO

== Demographics ==
Religions in Rampur city (2011)
Religion	Percent
Islam	70.02%
Hinduism	28.46%
Sikhism	1.00%
Other or not stated	0.52%
Distribution of religions

According to the 2011 Census of India, Rampur had a population of 325,248, compared to 281,549 in 2001, reflecting a growth of 16% during 2001–2011. Males constituted 52.2% and females 47.8% of the population. The sex ratio was 915 females per 1,000 males, lower than the national average of 940. The average literacy rate was 53.7%, below the national average of 64.3%; male literacy stood at 56% and female literacy at 51%. Children under six years of age numbered 37,945, accounting for 11.7% of the population (compared to 14% in 2001).

Rampur has a Muslim majority population. The surrounding region also has a significant Rohilla community.

Languages of Rampur (2011)
1. Urdu (61.5%)
2. Hindi (37.1%)
3. Punjabi (0.90%)
4. Others (0.50%)

At the time of the 2011 Census, 61.49% of the population reported Urdu as their first language, 37.11% Hindi (or a related language), and 0.90% Punjabi.

== Culture and Urdu poetry ==
Rampur is regarded as the third major centre of Urdu poetry after Delhi and Lucknow. Several prominent Urdu poets, including Daagh Dehlvi, Mirza Ghalib and Amir Meenai, were associated with the Rampur court. The Nawabs of Rampur were patrons of poetry and other fine arts, providing remuneration to poets attached to the darbar.

=== Architecture ===
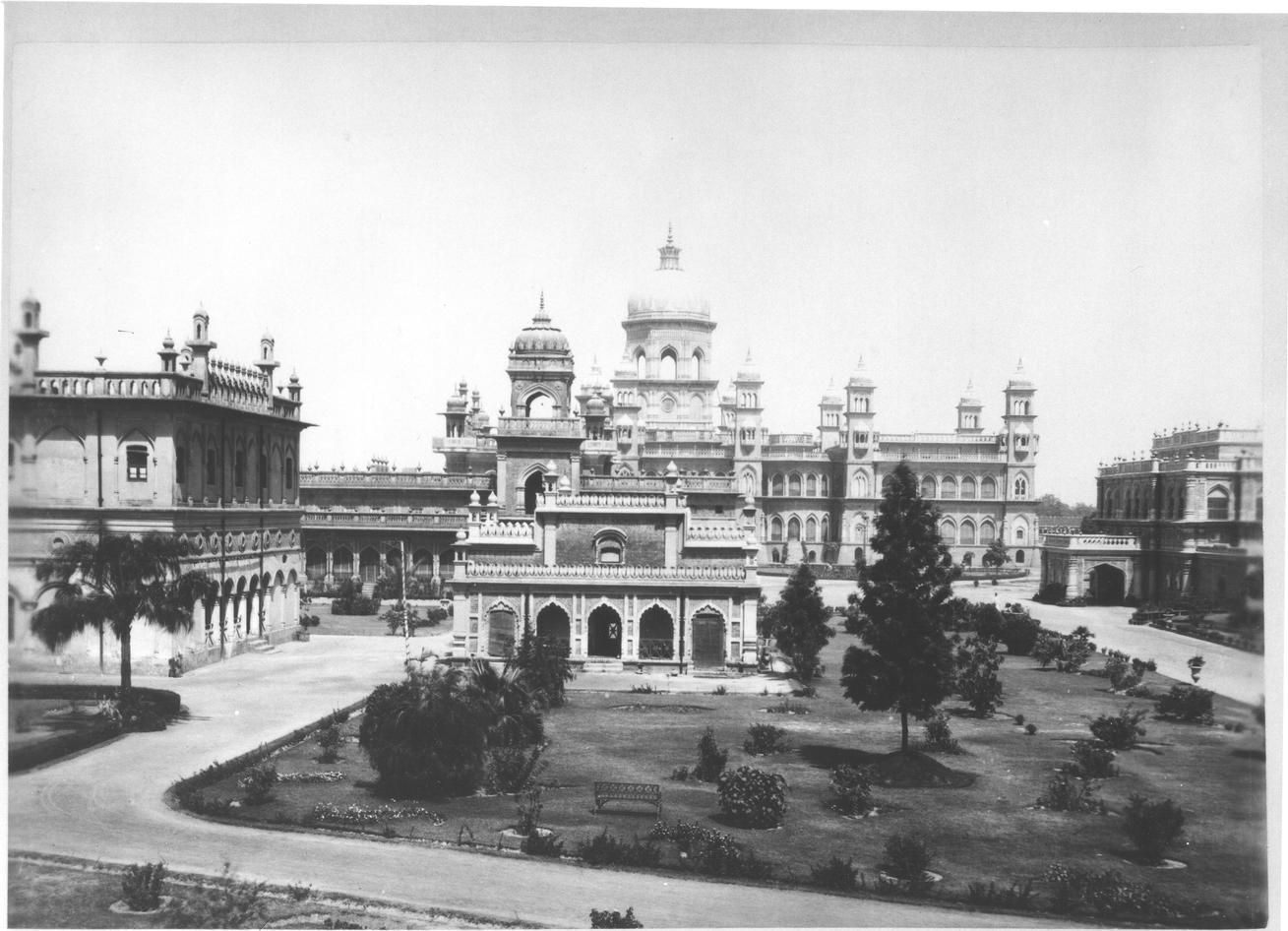
Small House Fort, now known as Raza Library

The rulers of Rampur had a distinct influence on the architecture of the region. The buildings and monuments display features of Mughal architecture. Some structures are centuries old and have undergone modifications over time.

One of the most notable monuments is the Fort of Rampur (Hindi:रामपुर का किला). It houses the Raza Library (also known as Hamid Manzil), formerly the palace of the Nawabs. The library holds a sizeable collection of Oriental manuscripts. The fort complex also contains an Imambara.

The Jama Masjid of Rampur is regarded as one of the finest examples of architecture in the city. It bears some resemblance to the Jama Masjid in Delhi. It was constructed by Nawab Faizullah Khan and reflects Mughal stylistic elements. The mosque has multiple entry and exit gates, three domes, and four tall minarets topped with golden finials. The main entrance features a clock tower with a large clock imported from Britain.

Several city gates were also constructed by the Nawabs, such as Shahbad Gate, Nawab Gate and Bilaspur Gate.

=== Music ===
Rampur has been associated with Indian classical music since the early 19th century. The Rampur-Sahaswan gharana of Hindustani classical music originated in the court of the Nawabs.

Ustad Mushtaq Hussain Khan, a court musician, was conferred the title Ratan by the Nawab of Rampur, who also gifted him a house in the Jail Road area of the city. He was the first recipient of the Padma Bhushan in classical music. Ustad Mehboob Khan, another court musician, was a khayal singer and veena player. His son, Ustad Inayat Hussain Khan (1849–1919), who lived in the Fort area, founded the Rampur-Sahaswan gharana and trained numerous disciples.

=== Cuisine ===
Rampuri cuisine, a branch of Mughlai cuisine, developed in the royal kitchens of the Nawabs. It is known for its distinctive flavours and recipes passed down through generations. Notable dishes include Rampuri fish, chicken changezi, pasande haleem, Rampuri korma, Rampuri mutton kebabs, doodhiya biryani, dogoshta biryani, adrak ka halwa and sohan halwa.

=== Knife making ===
Rampur has traditionally been known for the Rampuri chaaku, a type of knife that became popular in Bollywood crime thrillers during the 1960s and 1970s. The Government of Uttar Pradesh later banned the manufacture of knives with blades longer than 4.5 inches, leading to a decline in their production and popularity.

=== Rampur Greyhound ===
The Rampur Greyhound is a smooth-coated sighthound native to the region, often described as more substantially built than other greyhounds. It was a favoured hunting dog of the Nawabs, used for jackal coursing as well as hunting lions, tigers, leopards and panthers. Nawab Ahmad Ali Khan Bahadur bred the hounds by crossing the Tazi (Afghan hound) with the English Greyhound.

=== Festivals ===
Religious practices form an important part of daily life in Rampur, as in much of India. Most festivals are religious in origin, although many are celebrated across communities. Major Hindu festivals include Diwali, Holi, Vijayadashami, Mahashivaratri, Ram Navami, Basant Panchami, Krishna Janmashtami and Raksha Bandhan, which are also observed by Jains and Sikhs. Muslim festivals include Mawlid, Eid al-Fitr, Eid al-Adha and Muharram. Mahavir Jayanti is celebrated by Jains, Buddha Purnima by Buddhists, Guru Nanak Jayanti by Sikhs, and Good Friday and Christmas by Christians.

== Transport ==
=== Rail ===
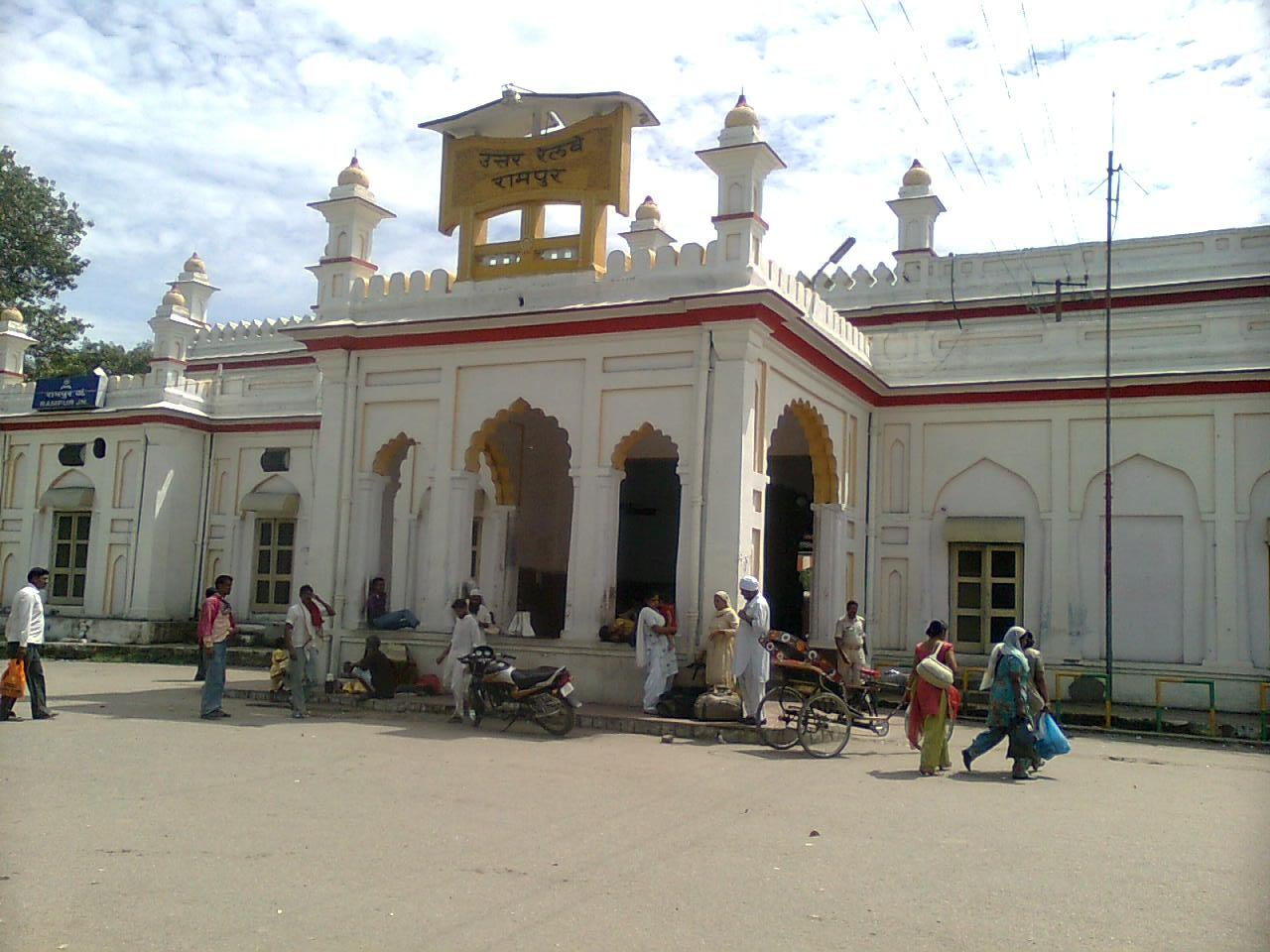
Rampur Railway Station

Rampur railway station (station code: RMU) lies on the Lucknow–Moradabad line and serves as a junction for the Kathgodam line, under the jurisdiction of Northern Railway. Important train connections include the Avadh Assam Express, Jammu Tawi–Sealdah Express, Kashi Vishwanath Express, Howrah–Amritsar Express, Ganga Sutlej Express and Satyagraha Express. Reservation facilities are computerised. Moradabad railway station lies about 30 km to the west, while Bareilly railway station is the nearest major station to the south-east. The railway lines at Rampur junction are fully electrified.

Other important trains passing through Rampur include the Delhi–Kathgodam Shatabdi Express, Delhi–Bareilly Intercity Express, Lucknow–Delhi Mail, Delhi–Kathgodam Ranikhet Express, Bareilly–Bhuj Ala Hazrat Express and Amritsar–Howrah Mail.

=== Road ===
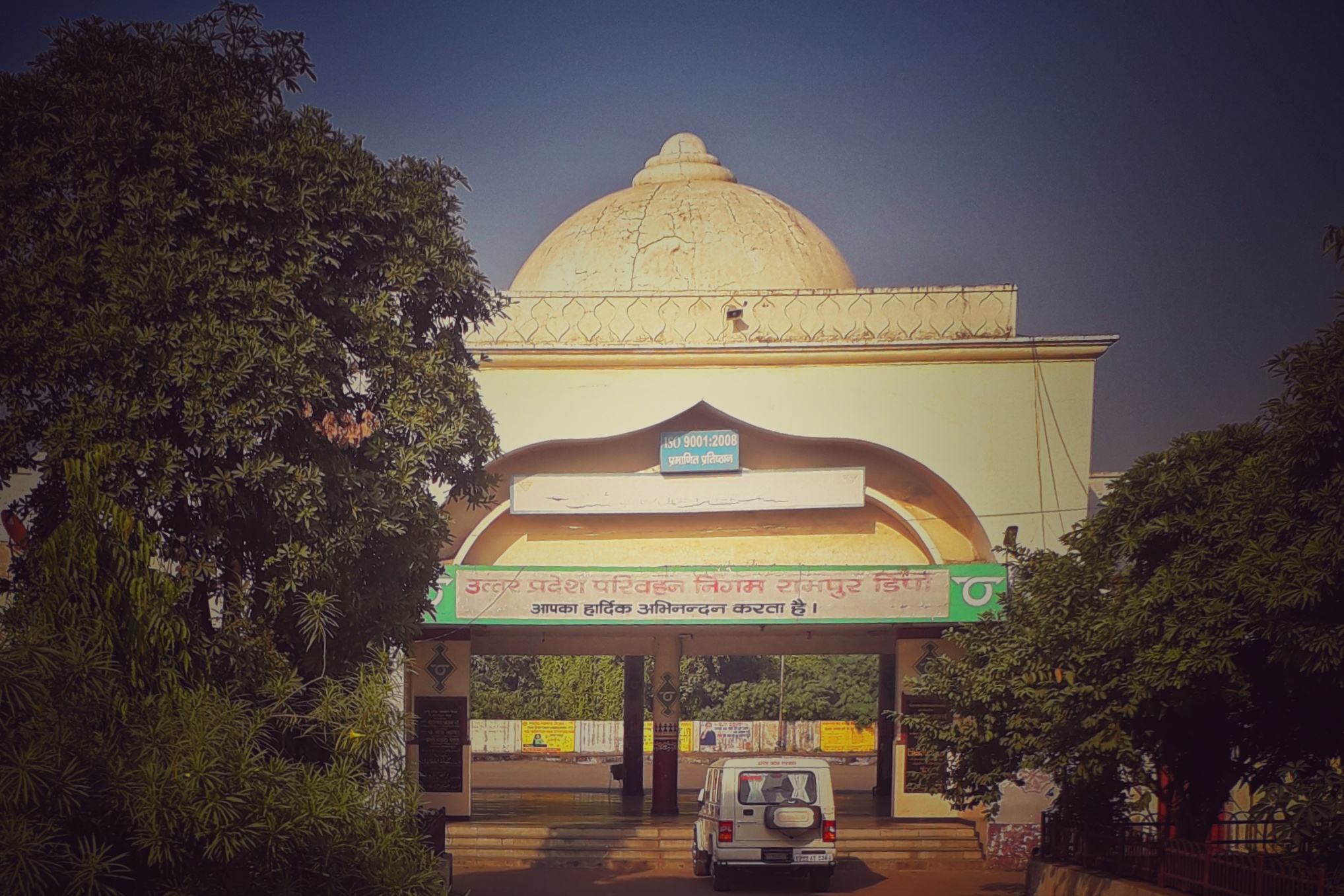
Roadways bus depot in Rampur.

National Highway 9 passes through Rampur. Regular buses operate to Moradabad at intervals of about 30 minutes. Direct bus services are available to major cities including Delhi, Lucknow, Bareilly, Aligarh, Haridwar, Rishikesh, Kanpur, Rupaidhiya and Agra. National Highway 530 originates in Rampur.

=== Air ===
Rampur is located within 70 km of multiple domestic airports. The nearest is Moradabad Airport, around 17 km from the railway station, which began commercial operations in 2024 with direct flights to Lucknow.

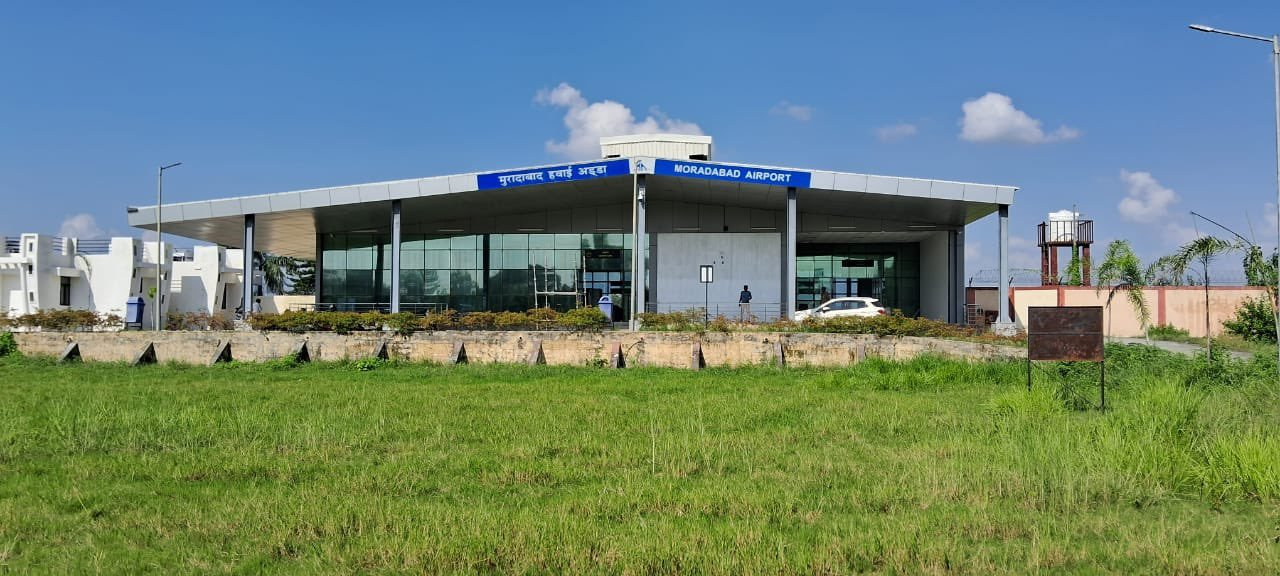
Moradabad Airport

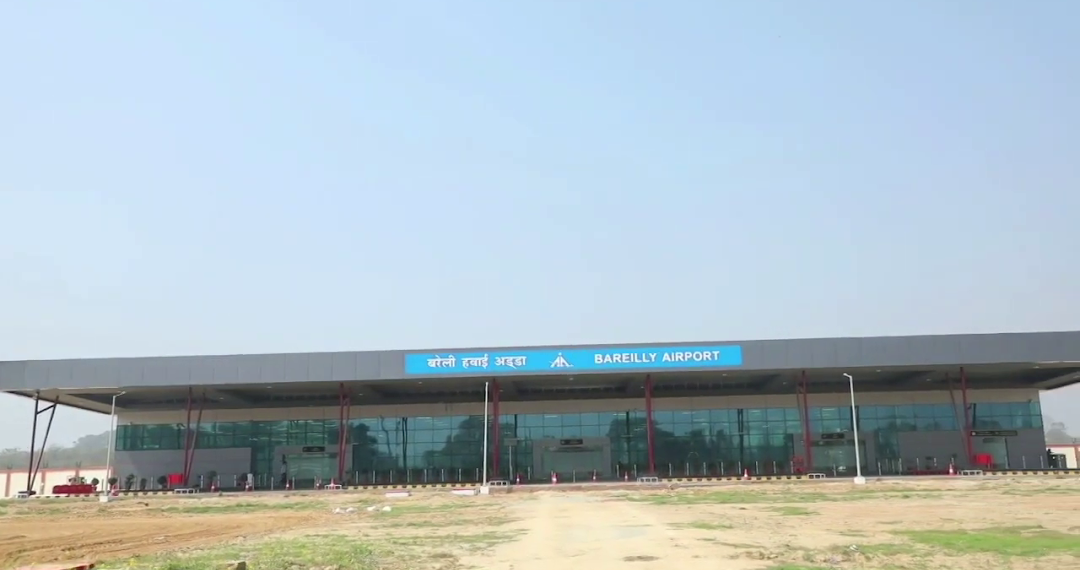
Bareilly Airport

Other nearby airports include Pantnagar Airport, about 58 km away, and Bareilly Airport, about 69 km from the city centre. Bareilly Airport is the best connected, with regular flights to Mumbai, New Delhi and Bangalore. The nearest international airport is Indira Gandhi International Airport in New Delhi.

Nearest Airport	Symbol	Distance (in km)
Moradabad	MZS	12
Pantnagar	PGH	58
Bareilly	BEK	65
Ghaziabad	HDO	162
Dehradun	DED	175
New Delhi	DEL	187

== Places of interest ==
=== Jama Masjid ===
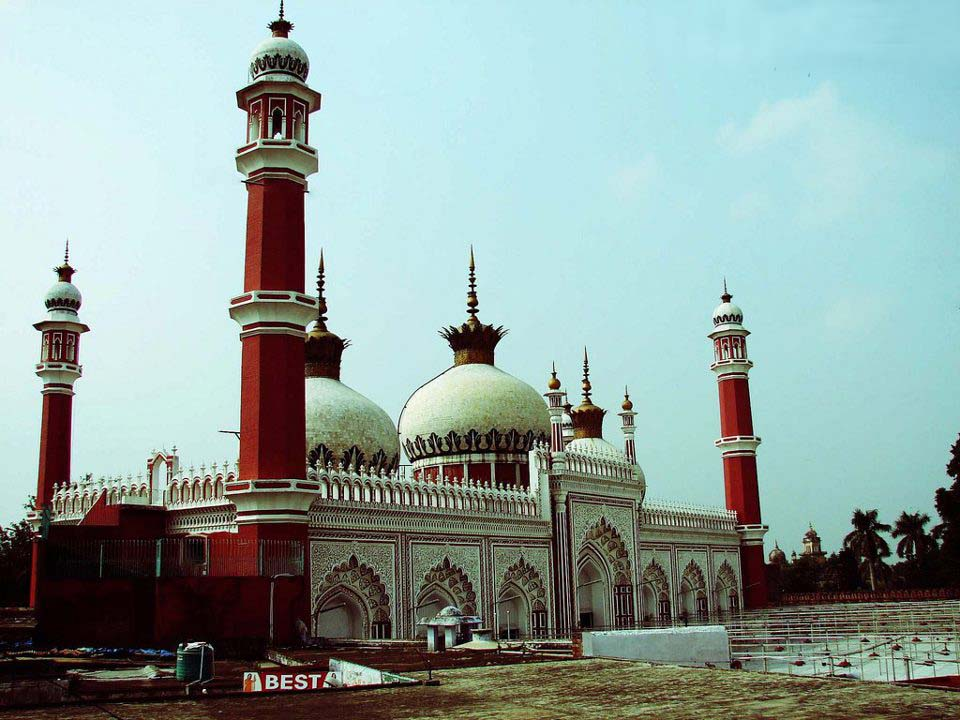
Jama Masjid, Rampur

The foundation of the Jama Masjid in Rampur was laid by Nawab Faizullah Khan. It was constructed at a cost of ₹3,00,000 and later completed by Nawab Kalb Ali Khan.

The area around the mosque developed into a commercial hub, known today as the Shadab Market. A jewellery market called Sarrafa also exists in its vicinity. The shops, rented out to traders to meet the mosque's requirements, are owned by both Hindus and Muslims, and attract customers from both communities. The market is often cited as a symbol of communal harmony in the city.

=== Raza Library ===
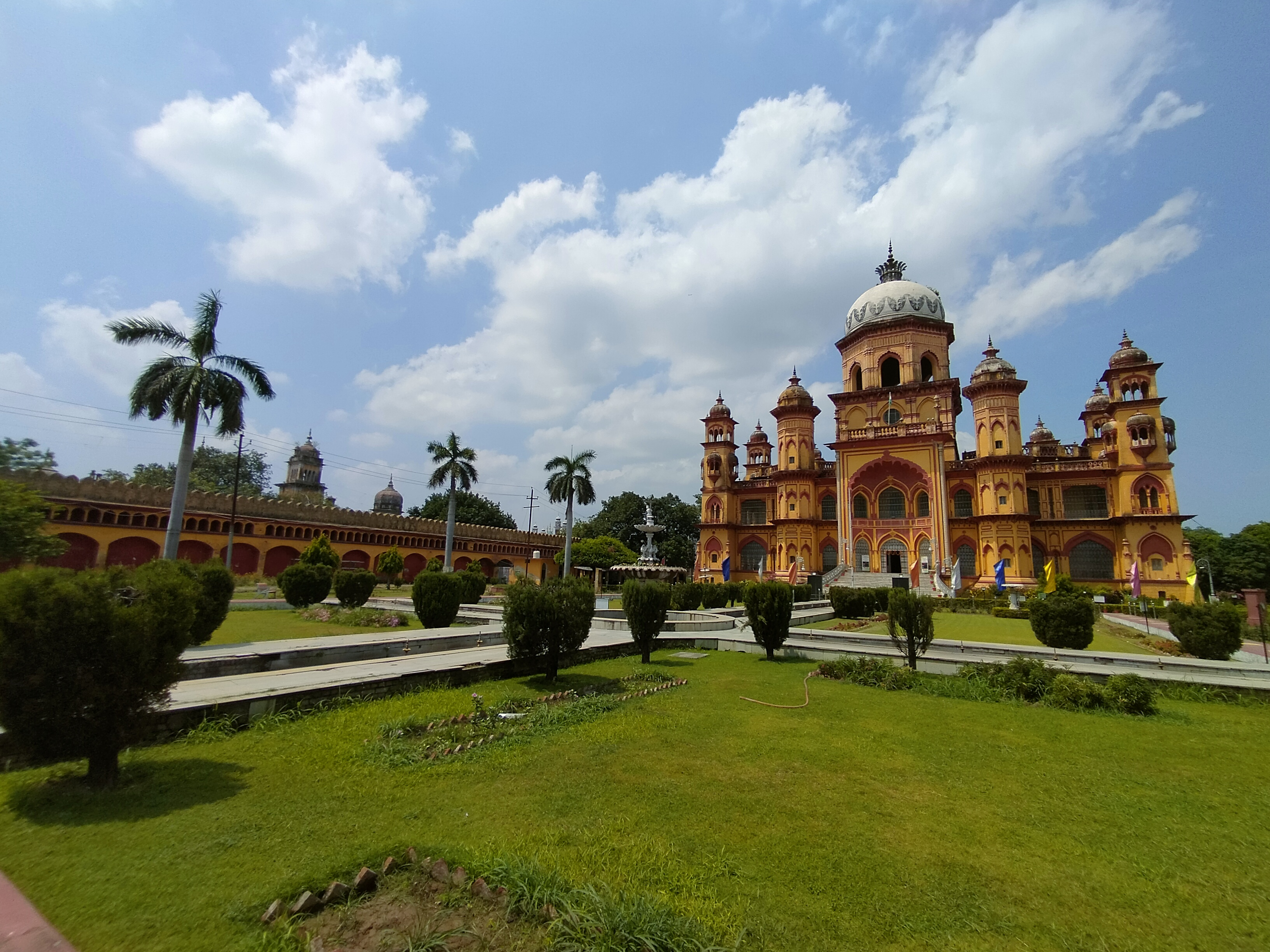
Raza Library, Rampur

The Raza Library was established by Nawab Faizullah Khan, who ruled Rampur from 1774 to 1794, with his personal collection of manuscripts and specimens of Islamic calligraphy in the late 18th century. It is regarded as one of the largest libraries in Asia. Successive Nawabs expanded the collection, particularly during the reign of Nawab Ahmad Ali Khan (1794–1840).

The library holds a rare and extensive collection of manuscripts, historical documents, miniature paintings, astronomical instruments, and works in multiple languages, including Arabic, Persian, Sanskrit, Hindi, Urdu, Pashto, Tamil, and Turkish. It also houses approximately 30,000 printed books and periodicals.

=== Rampur Planetarium ===
Rampur Planetarium is India's first digital laser technology based planetarium. The building is complete and equipped, with data said to be directly updated by NASA.

=== Gandhi Samadhi ===
The Gandhi Samadhi is a memorial dedicated to Mahatma Gandhi. It commemorates his role in the struggle for India's independence from the British Raj.

=== Kothi Khas Bagh ===
Kothi Khas Bagh is a palace located in Rampur, about 30 km east of Moradabad in Uttar Pradesh. Once the residence of the Nawabs of Rampur, the palace is set within a 300-acre compound and has about 200 rooms. Built in a European style with a blend of Islamic architecture and British architecture, it included private apartments, offices, music rooms, and a personal cinema hall. The halls feature Burma teak interiors and Belgium glass chandeliers, while the main staircase is made of Italian marble. A statue of Kalb Ali Khan, the second Nawab of Rampur, is a notable feature. The palace is currently in a dilapidated condition due to age and neglect.

=== Ambedkar Park ===
Ambedkar Park is a memorial dedicated to Bhimrao Ambedkar. The park contains a statue of Ambedkar and a faux mountain structure that provides a view of the surroundings. A railway line runs along its boundary.

=== Aryabhatt Planetarium ===
The Aryabhatt Planetarium was established in 2012 by the Uttar Pradesh Government as a science museum to educate the public about astronomical events, lunar eclipses, and related phenomena.

== Education ==
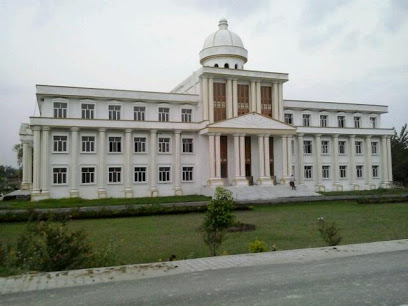
Mohammad Ali Jauhar University, the first university to be established in Rampur

The education sector in Rampur and its surrounding villages has been developing with new investments. The city has several secondary and higher secondary schools as well as colleges. Educational institutions in Rampur attract students from neighbouring areas such as Kashipur-Anga, Kemri and Bilaspur, as a number of higher education institutions affiliated with M. J. P. Rohilkhand University, Bareilly, have been established in the city.

Despite the presence of many institutions, Rampur has an average literacy rate of 53.34%, which is lower than the national average of 59.5%. Male literacy stands at 61.40%, while female literacy is 44.44%. Mohammad Ali Jauhar University is the first university to be established in Rampur.

Public and government primary schools also play a crucial role in education, particularly in the rural areas of the district. Newer institutions such as the Impact College of Science & Technology have also been established.

Names of Educational Institutes	Affiliation With
Mohammad Ali Jauhar University	Private
Government Girls Post Graduate College, Rampur	M. J. P. Rohilkhand University
St. John Vianney School	CBSE Board, New Delhi
Sunway Senior Secondary School	CBSE Board, New Delhi
Dubai Public School, Rampur	C.B.S.E. pattern / English Medium
Dayawati Modi Academy Sr. Sec. School	CBSE Board, New Delhi
Whitehall Public School	CBSE Board, New Delhi
East West Senior Secondary School	CBSE Board, New Delhi
Apex Group of Institutions	UPTU & MJPRU, Kaushalganj, Rampur
Smart Indian Model School	CBSE Board, New Delhi

== Economy ==
=== Industry and agriculture ===
Rampur has a predominantly agriculture-based economy, with fertile land but limited industrial activity and virtually no mineral extraction. The main industries in Rampur include winemaking, sugar processing, textile weaving, and the manufacture of agricultural implements. An inoperative sugar mill, closed in 1999 due to political disputes, is now being revived with state government approval.

The major cash crop of the region is mentha, and menthol oil production is a significant economic activity.

The company formerly known as Rampur Distillery & Chemical Company Ltd., now Radico Khaitan, was established in Rampur in 1943 and is India's second-largest liquor manufacturer. The Rampur distillery produces high-grade Extra Neutral Spirits (ENA) from molasses and grain, with an annual capacity of 75 million litres of molasses ENA, 30 million litres of grain neutral spirits, and 460,000 litres of malt whisky.

Rampur also has a long-standing kite-making industry, producing kites in various sizes and shapes that are in demand across Uttar Pradesh. Another notable industry is beedi manufacturing. Rampur was also famous for its knives, known as Rampuri Chaaku; however, the Government of Uttar Pradesh later banned the manufacture of knives with blades longer than 4.5 inches, reducing their prevalence.

=== Other establishments ===
Name	Category	Installation year
Kapil Menthol & Allied Products, Rampur	Mentha oil	1998
Indian Toners & Developers Ltd., Rampur	Export Quality Toner Manufacturing Plant	1992
Radico Khaitan Ltd, Rampur		1943
Xerox Modi Corp., Rampur(Closed)	Makers of all types of Toners, Developers for Photocopiers	1987
Titanor Components Limited, Rampur	Metal Anodes, water electrolysers, electro-chlorinators & cathodic protection systems	1983
Wheels India Ltd, Rampur	Makers of Wheel Bases for all type of Vehicles	1960
Enlog India, Rampur	Photovoltaic Industry	1995
Bigarette & Co., Rampur	Herbal Products	1948
Kemper Herbal Pvt. Ltd, Rampur	Herbal Goods and Mixture	2002
Rampur Fertilizers Ltd, Rampur	Makers of Single Super Phosphate, Sulphuric Acid & Alum	1960

The major crops grown in the district include maize, sugarcane, and rice. Most crops are used for local consumption rather than commercial sale.

Economic development indicators

Indicators	2004	2008
Work Participation Rate	28%	27%
No. of Branches of Scheduled Commercial Bank	99	100
Habitations connected to pucca roads	89%	93%
Electrified households	38%	40%
Houses with land-line connections	10%	14%
Avg annual per capita income	Rs. 70,163	Rs. 75,314
Per capita expenditure	Rs. 19,120	Rs. 8,318
Inflation Index	1.14%	1.38%

== Communication and media ==
=== Communication networks ===
All major telecommunication service providers in India offer services in Rampur.

GSM / Mobile Service Providers	CDMA / Wireless Service Providers	Broadband / Internet Service Providers
Bharti Airtel	(Most legacy CDMA operators in India are now defunct; modern wireless is unified 4G/5G)	Airtel Xstream Fiber
Vodafone Idea (Vi)	—	JioFiber / Reliance Jio
Jio (Reliance Jio Infocomm)	—	BSNL Broadband
BSNL Mobile	—	Excitel Broadband

=== Radio services ===
Radio services available in Rampur include All India Radio and Doordarshan.

Service Provider	Frequency	Service Provider	Frequency
All India Radio	MW 336.7m or 891 kHz	All India Radio	FM 102.90 MHz

=== Print media ===
Hindi daily newspapers published in Rampur include Amrit Vichar, Dainik Jagran, Amar Ujala, and The Hindustan. Prominent English dailies such as The Times of India, The Hindustan Times, The Young Turk, and Indian Express have comparatively fewer readers in the city. The local Urdu newspaper, Rampur ka Elaan, has been published in Rampur since 1991.

== Notable people ==
- Mohammad Ali, Pakistani actor
- Baldev Singh Aulakh, Indian politician and minister in the Uttar Pradesh government
- Maulana Azad, first Education Minister of India and former President of India
- Obaidullah Baig, Pakistani scholar, Urdu writer, columnist, media expert, and documentary filmmaker
- Athar Shah Khan Jaidi, Pakistani comedian and writer, born in Rampur
- Mohammad Ali Jauhar, journalist, scholar, political activist, and poet
- Azam Khan, Indian politician of the Samajwadi Party
- Zulfikar Ali Khan, Nawab of Rampur and former Member of Parliament
- Hamid Ali Murad, known as Murad, Indian actor
- Raza Murad, Bollywood actor, born and brought up in Rampur
- Mukhtar Abbas Naqvi, Indian politician and cabinet minister in the Modi government
- Pran, Bollywood actor, brought up in Rampur
- Baba Rampuri, American-born Naga Sadhu and ascetic who emigrated to India
- Rukhsar Rehman, Indian film and television actress and model
- Javed Siddiqui, Indian writer and screenwriter
- Shama Zaidi, screenwriter, theatre actress, documentary filmmaker, costume designer, art director, and journalist

== Bibliography ==
- Syed Asghar Ali Shadami, Ahwalay Riyasatay Rampur (Tarikhi wa Maashrati Pusmanzar), ed. Rizwanullah Khan Enayati
- Tanzim Ahbab Rampur Karachi Nagin Chowrangee, a great masterpiece from Tanzeem
