= N.K.B.M.G Postgraduate College =

N.K.B.M.G Postgraduate College, Chandausi
- Type: Government Aided
- Established: 1964
- Affiliations: M. J. P. Rohilkhand University
- Principal: Dr. Alka Agrawal
- Location: Chandausi, India
- Campus: Rural
- Website: [-]

Shri Nawal Kishore Bharatiya Municipal Girls Postgraduate College (N.K.B.M.G Postgraduate College) is situated in Chandausi town of Moradabad district in Uttar Pradesh, India and it was founded on 6 October 1964, by the Late Nawal Kishore Bharatiya. It is affiliated from M.J.P. Rohilkhand University, Bareilly.

Initially N.K.B.M.G Postgraduate College started graduate classes in Hindi, English, Sanskrit, Economics, Education, Sociology, Political Science, Music Vocal and Music Instrumental. B Ed classes were started in 1973 and those in Home Science were started in 1984. With the beginning of MA classes in Sanskrit and Political Science, the institution became postgraduate college.

== College faculty ==
- Faculty of Arts
- Faculty of Education
- Faculty of Science

Postgraduate Classes

- English
- Sanskrit
- Political Science
- Economics
- Home Science

Graduate Classes English Sanskrit Economics Sociology Hindi Music - Vocal & Instrumental Education Political Science Home Science Science- ZBC & PCM Physical Education

== Courses ==
=== Graduate Level ===
BA

- Hindi Literature
- English Literature
- Sanskrit
- Economics
- Education
- Sociology
- Political Science
- Home Science
- Music Vocal
- Music Instrumental (Tabla)

B.Sc

- Zoology
- Botany
- Chemistry
- Mathematics
- Physics

B.Ed

- Education

=== Diploma Courses ===
- Diploma in Interior Designing
- PG Diploma in Computer Programming

== Alumni ==
- Anupam Sharma
