= Rampuri =

Indian gravity knife

The Rampuri (रामपूरी चाकू) is an Indian pocket knife with a single-edged blade typically 9 to 12 inches (23 to 30 cm) long, with shorter variants also made. This includes both switchblade knives and also step-lock types. The name Rampuri comes from the town of Rampur, Uttar Pradesh. The royal bladesmiths of the local Nawabs of Rampur started making knives after the popularization of firearms after the 18th century.

The Rampuri is still in use today as a criminal weapon by the local Indian mafia, although locally made guns and sophisticated automatic pistols have largely taken their place. However, in the mid-1990s, the Government of Uttar Pradesh banned making such knives longer than 4.5 inches (11 cm) in blade length, which led to a drop in popularity of the knife.

The knife was often featured in Bollywood crime thrillers in the 1960s and 1970s.
