= Aryabhatt Planetarium =

Planetarium in India

- आर्यभट्ट नक्षत्रशाला
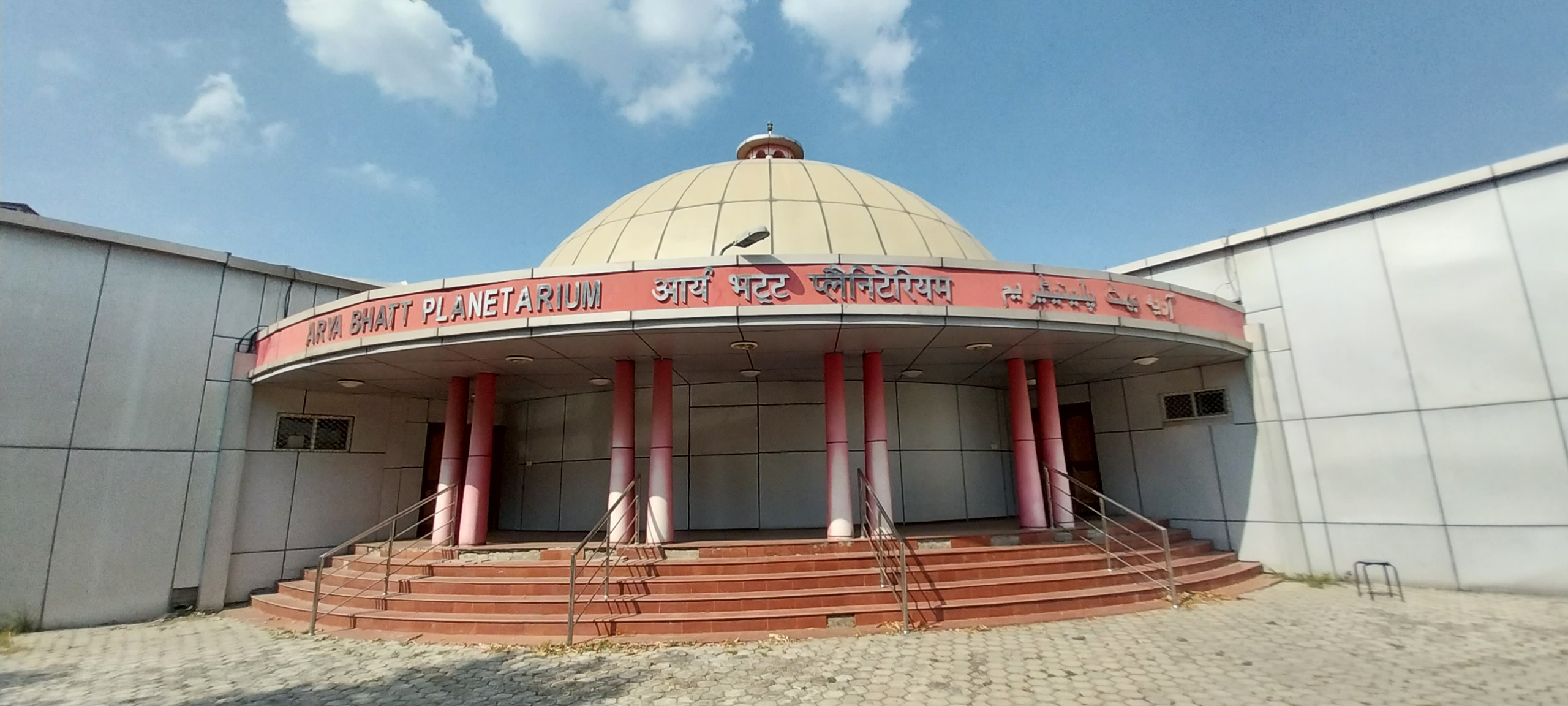
- Former name: Bhimrao Ambedkar Planetarium
- Established: 18 September 2012
- Location: Rampur, Uttar Pradesh, India
- Coordinates: 28°49′8.19″N 79°2′0.9″E
- Type: Planetarium, Science museum
- Collections: Astronomy and space science exhibits
- Owner: Government of Uttar Pradesh

Aryabhatt Planetarium is located in Rampur, Uttar Pradesh, and is dedicated to astronomy and space science education. It was established to provide the public with insights into celestial events such as lunar eclipses and other astronomical phenomena. Built in 2012 by the Government of Uttar Pradesh, it is the first laser planetarium in India, using advanced digital laser technology to project realistic celestial simulations onto a dome-shaped screen.

The Aryabhatt Planetarium connects to the National Aeronautics and Space Administration (NASA)'s database, providing up-to-date information on celestial events, which are then displayed using laser projectors.

In 2024, it was reported that the Aryabhatt Planetarium had been closed for over a year due to water damage sustained during the previous monsoon season, which affected its equipment. Despite inspections by officials, no action had been taken to reopen the facility, as of June 2024.

== History ==
The planetarium project was announced in 2006 by then-Chief Minister of Uttar Pradesh, Mulayam Singh Yadav. It was named the Bhimrao Ambedkar Planetarium by the Bahujan Samaj Party's Mayawati government in 2007, it was later renamed Aryabhatt Planetarium, after the Indian astronomer and mathematician Aryabhata, by the Samajwadi Party government under Akhilesh Yadav. It was built at a cost of ₹28 crore. It was opened to the public on 18 September 2012. It is operated under the supervision of the Science and Technology Department, Moradabad.

The Aryabhatt Planetarium was inaugurated on 17 September 2012, by Chief Minister Akhilesh Yadav and former Chief Minister Mulayam Singh Yadav.

The Aryabhatt Planetarium was reported to be the first in India to receive direct online updates from NASA. These updates are provided through a U.S.-based company, Evans & Sutherland, which also manufactured the planetarium's equipment. In January 2018, a telescope provided by the Council of Science And Technology, Lucknow was installed at the Aryabhatt Planetarium.

== Shows ==
The planetarium provides 3D shows that simulate celestial events, allowing visitors to experience stars, planets, and galaxies in a theater-like setting. It runs three daily shows, each lasting about 50 minutes, with additional shows available for larger groups or during holidays.

== Gallery ==
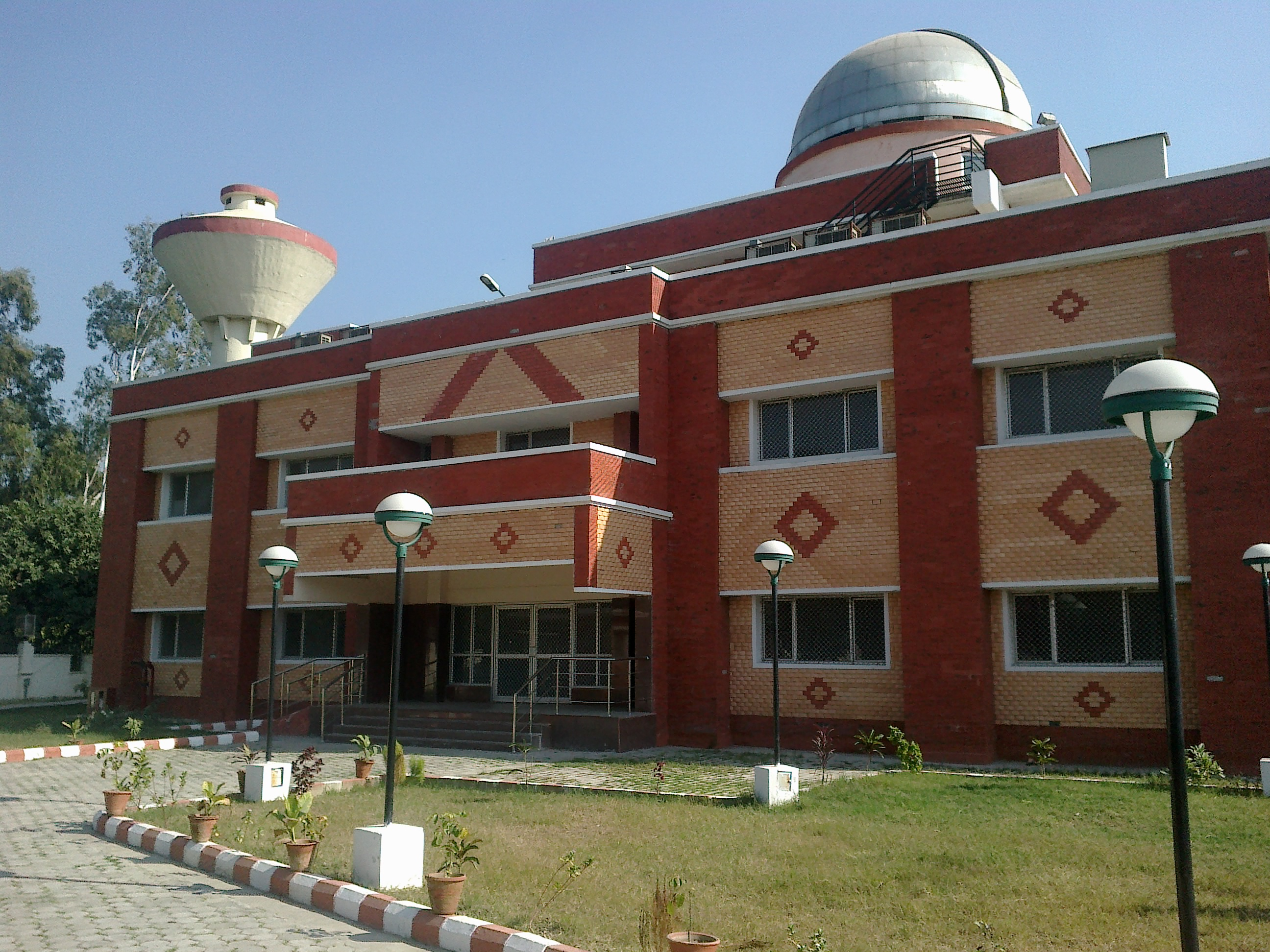

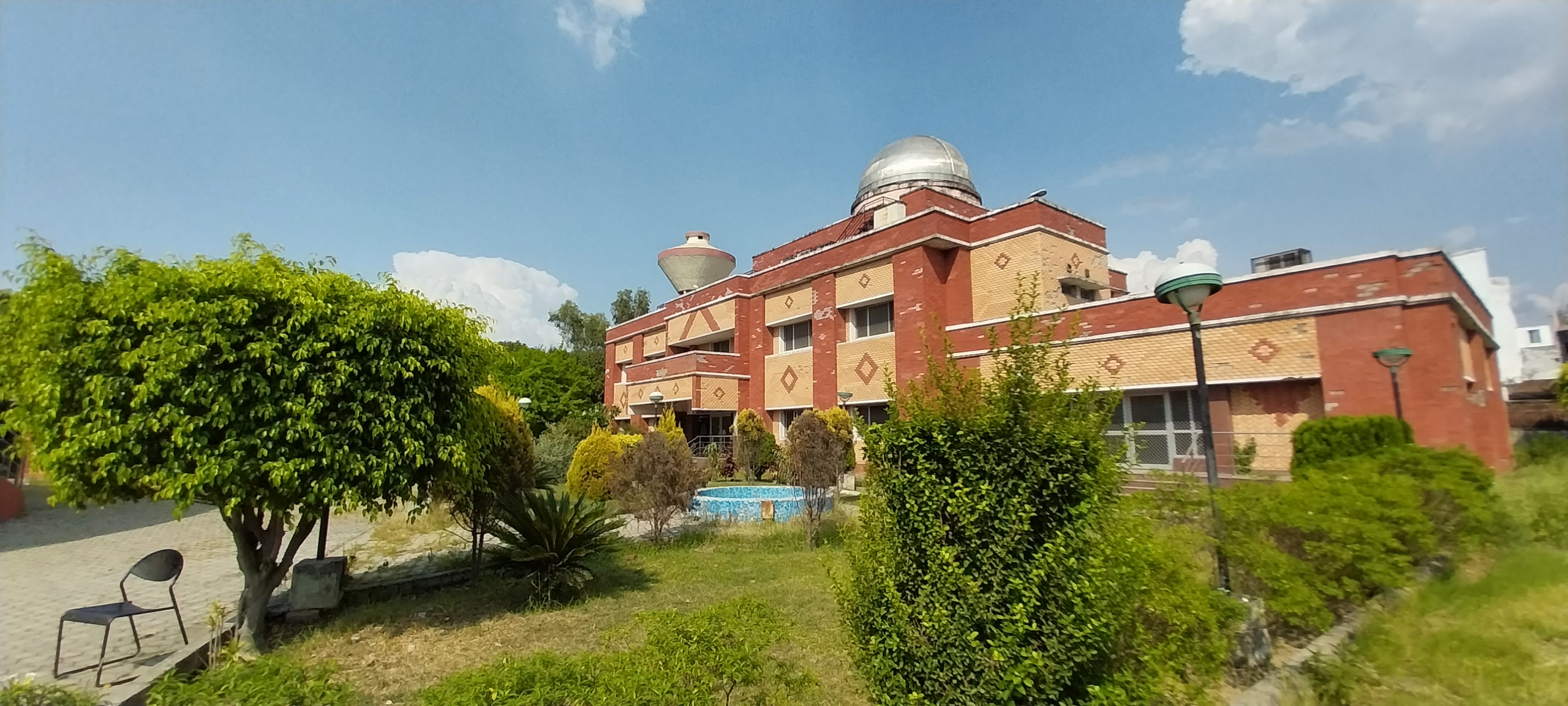

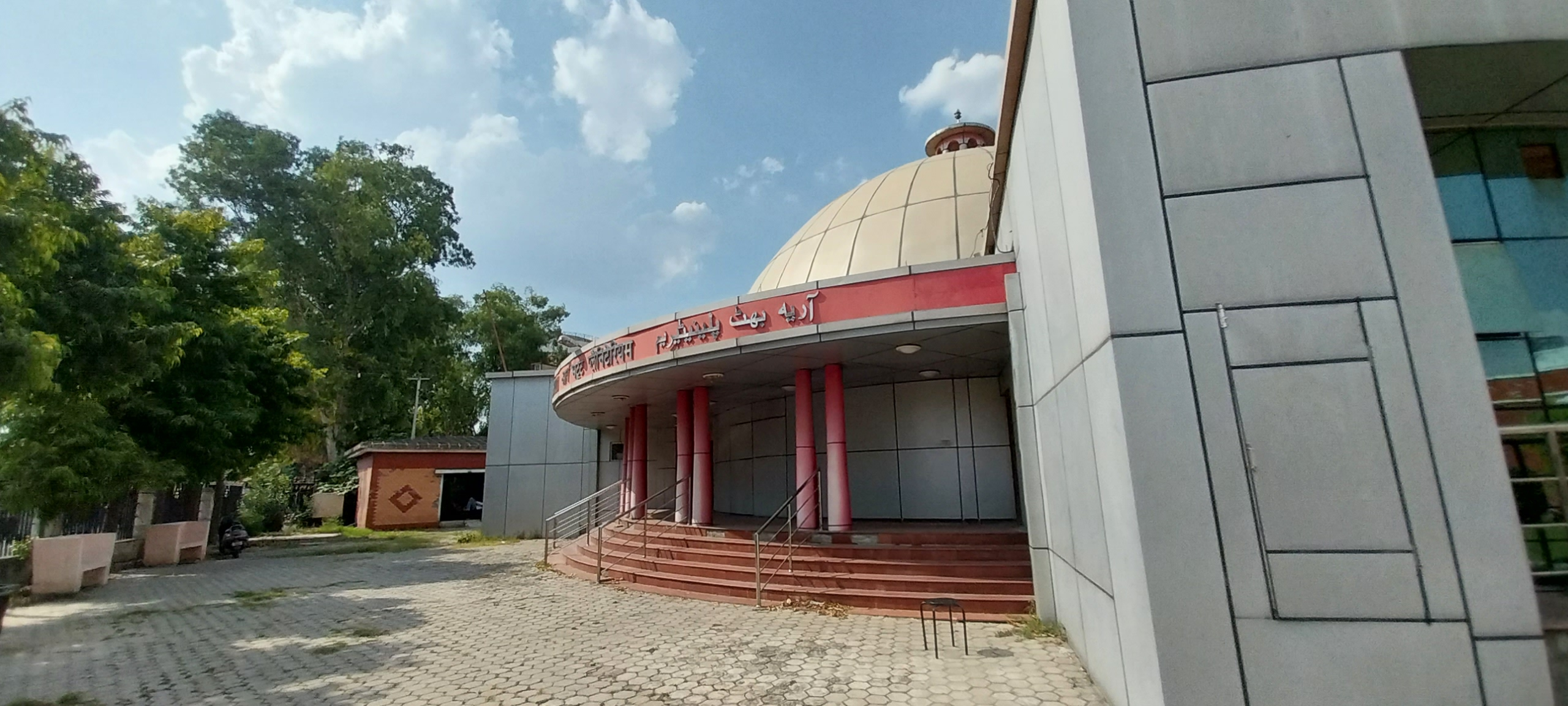
