= Athar Shah Khan Jaidi =

Pakistani writer (1943–2020)

Ather Shah Khan
- اطہر شاہ خان
- Born: Ather Shah Khan; 1 January 1943; Rampur, Rampur State, British India
- Died: 10 May 2020 (aged 77); Karachi, Sindh, Pakistan
- Occupations: Comedian; writer; poet
- Years active: 1970 – 1997
- Known for: Mr. Jaedi (character on TV)
- Awards: Pride of Performance Award by the Government of Pakistan in 2001; Pakistan Television Gold Medal Award (1989)

Athar Shah Khan (Urdu: اطہر شاہ خان; 1 January 1943 – 10 May 2020) was a Pakistani comedian, poet and writer. He performed in many of the plays and films he scripted for Radio Pakistan, Pakistan Television, and Lollywood. He is more popularly known by his own-created character Jaidi (جیدی). He is the recipient of the Pride of Performance Award by the Government of Pakistan (2001).

== Early life and education ==
Born on 1 January 1943 in the Indian city of Rampur, Uttar Pradesh, Athar Shah Khan arrived in Lahore in 1947 with his family. He gained his primary education in Lahore and secondary education in Peshawar. He completed his graduate degree from Urdu Science College, now Federal Urdu University in Karachi. Later, he gained a Master's degree in Journalism from the University of the Punjab, Lahore. In 1957, he moved back to Karachi.

== Career ==
Khan started his career as a writer for Radio Pakistan and wrote around 700 plays. His radio play Rang Hi Rang, Jedi Ke Sang (1973) aired for more than 19 years. He gained popularity by acting out his own-created character Jaidi in a PTV series "Intezar Farmaye" which was aired in 1975. His first film as a writer was Bazi which was released in 1970. The film presented Muhammad Ali and Nadeem together for the first time. He also scripted the platinum jubilee Punjabi film Manji Kithay Dahwan (1974).

Khan was especially famous for his funny poetry. He participated in a large number of Urdu comedy Mushaira. He was famous for his typical styled funny poetry. He used "Jaidi" as his Takhaluus تخلص (a pseudonym used by the poets of the subcontinent, especially Urdu poets along with their original name and sometimes without the original name).

== Radio programs ==
- Rung hi rung, Jedi kay sung (this program ran for more than 19 years)

== Notable television plays ==
Khan acted in, wrote, directed and produced many television serials on Pakistan Television, including:

- Intezar Farmaiay
- Lakhon mein teen
- Ba adab ba mulahiza hoshiyar
- Problem House
- Haye jaidi
- Hello Hello
- Burger Family

== Filmography ==
- Bazi (1970) (A Golden jubilee film)
- Maan bani dulhan
- Manjhi Kithay Danhwan (1974)

== Books ==
- Taank Jhaank, a collection of humorous poetry.

== Personal life ==
Khan was married and had four sons.

== Death ==
Athar Shah Khan Jaidi died in Karachi on 10 May 2020, at age 76 from a heart attack and he was also diabetic. His funeral prayer was offered at Masjid-i-Aqsa in Gulshan-i-Iqbal and he is buried in the Sakhi Hasan Graveyard, Karachi.

== Awards ==
- Pride of Performance (2001)
- PTV Gold Medal (1989)
