= Kundarki =

- town
- Location in Uttar Pradesh, India
- Coordinates: 28.683°N 78.785°E
- Country: India
- State: Uttar Pradesh
- District: Moradabad

Languages
  - Official: Hindi
- Time zone: UTC+5:30 (IST)

Kundarki is a town in the Moradabad district of Uttar Pradesh, India. It is located on the Moradabad–Agra highway, 18 km from the city of Moradabad.

== History ==
The settlement of Kundarki (कुंदारकी) predates the Mughal Empire. Historical records show its existence as early as the 10th century. Much later, in 1363, the explorer Ibn Battuta stayed there briefly.

In 1628, the Mughal emperor Shah Jahan named Abdul Razzaq Sahab as Kundarki's shahar qazi, an Islamic judge. One of his descendants, Saeyad Raza Ali, was knighted by the British government and made the agent-general of South Africa. In 1874, Mir Hadi Ali, the grandfather of Sir Saeyad Raza Ali, introduced a railway station in Kundarki.

Kundarki also came under the bhatnagar king the kaystha dynasty .They reside in kundarki till now.

Kundarki became a panchayat in 1858 and a "town area" in 1907. In 1960, it was made a community development block, and over the next 30 years, a water system (1962), power station (1976) and police station (1986) were built. In 1994, to reflect the town's development, the government of Uttar Pradesh declared it a nagar panchayat.

A prominent attraction in Kundarki is its miniature Taj Mahal, made by a social worker, Chidda Khansari.

== Demographics ==
Kundarki had a population of 29,951 as of the 2011 Indian census. Of those, 15,863 were male and 14,088 were female.

== Political leadership ==
Mohammad Mehdi Hasan chairman of Kundarki.

== Economy ==
There are no major businesses in Kundarki, but business and money flow in from nearby Moradabad. The town has two petrol pump (Kundarki Filling Station). Prachin Shiv Mandir, The Saadat Mosque & The Qazi Mosque is the main socio-cultural center.

== Education ==
=== Colleges and universities ===
- Mindlayer Institute
- Meena Institute of Technology and management
- Ambition Coaching center
- Imamuddin Turki Memorial Institute of Higher Education
- N. Bhushan Institute of Technology
- Majeed Khan Memorial Public School
- IQRA Public School
- Kundarki Intermediate College
- J.L.M. Intermediate College
- Evergreen Intermediate College
- Government Girls Intermediate College
- Kisan Public Inter College
- Kisan Public Primary School
- Hazrat Ali Memorial Education Society

=== Public and Montessori schools ===
- Skyline Public School Mohanpur
- N. Bhushan Public School
- Jwali Ram Inter College Jaitpur Patti
- Al-Baru Academy
- I.L.M. School
- Sheesh Academy
- Dayanand Bal Vidya Mandir
- Adarsh Bal Vidyalya
- Madrasa Ahle Sunnat Abwabul Uloom
- Madrasa Islamia Latifia Gulshan e Islam
- Madrasa Islamia Basheerul Uloom
- Madrasa Islamia Maqsoodul Uloom
- Madrasa Islamia Ahle Sunnat Gulshane Mustafa
- Madrasa Talimul Quran Kundarki
