= Bahjoi =

- City
- Location in Uttar Pradesh, India Bahjoi (India)
- Coordinates: 28.393°N 78.623°E
- Country: India
- State: Uttar Pradesh
- Elevation: 655 m (2,149 ft)

Population (2011)
  - Total: 37,037
- PIN: 244410
- Website: up.gov.in

Bahjoi is a Nagar Palika Parishad city in Sambhal district, Moradabad division, in the Indian state of Uttar Pradesh. Bahjoi is the headquarters of Sambhal district. It was famous for a glass factory during the British colonisation.

== Demographics ==
Religions in Bahjoi
Religion	Percent
Hinduism	71.92%
Islam	27.41%
Others†	0.68%

In 2011 Bahjoi Nagar Palika Parishad had a total population of 37,037, with 19,168 males and 17,869 females.

== Notable people ==
- Rajeev Kumar Varshney (born 1973), agricultural scientist, born in Bahjoi

== Transport ==
Bahjoi is well connected to Sambhal city, New Delhi, Ghaziabad, Moradabad, Budaun, Bareilly, Hathras, Khair, Bulandshahr, Aligarh, Allahabad, Agra, Kanpur, Mumbai, via train. There is also a railway station.
