= Laxmi Gautam =

Indian politician

Laxmi Gautam लक्ष्मी गौतम

MLA, 16th Legislative Assembly
- In office Mar 2012 – Mar 2017
- Preceded by: Girish Chandra
- Succeeded by: Gulab Devi
- Constituency: Chandausi

Personal details
- Born: 1 July 1979 (age 47) Budaun, Uttar Pradesh
- Citizenship: India
- Party: Samajwadi Party
- Spouse: Dileep Kumar Varshney
- Children: 2 daughters
- Parent: Nempal (father)
- Education: M. J. P. Rohilkhand University
- Profession: Politician

Laxmi Gautam (Hindi: लक्ष्मी गौतम) is an Indian politician and was a member of the 16th Legislative Assembly of Uttar Pradesh of India. She represented the Chandausi constituency of Uttar Pradesh and is a member of the Samajwadi Party.

== Early life and education ==
Laxmi Gautam was born in Budaun, Uttar Pradesh. She holds Master of Arts degree from M. J. P. Rohilkhand University. Gautam belongs to the scheduled caste community.

== Political career ==
Laxmi Gautam has been a MLA for one term. She represented the Chandausi constituency and is a member of the Samajwadi Party.

== Posts Held ==
#	From	To	Position	Comments
01	2012	2017	Member, 16th Legislative Assembly	

== See also ==
- Chandausi
- Politics of India
- Sixteenth Legislative Assembly of Uttar Pradesh
- Uttar Pradesh Legislative Assembly
