= Raza Library =

Repository of Indo-Islamic cultural heritage in Rampur, Uttar Pradesh, India

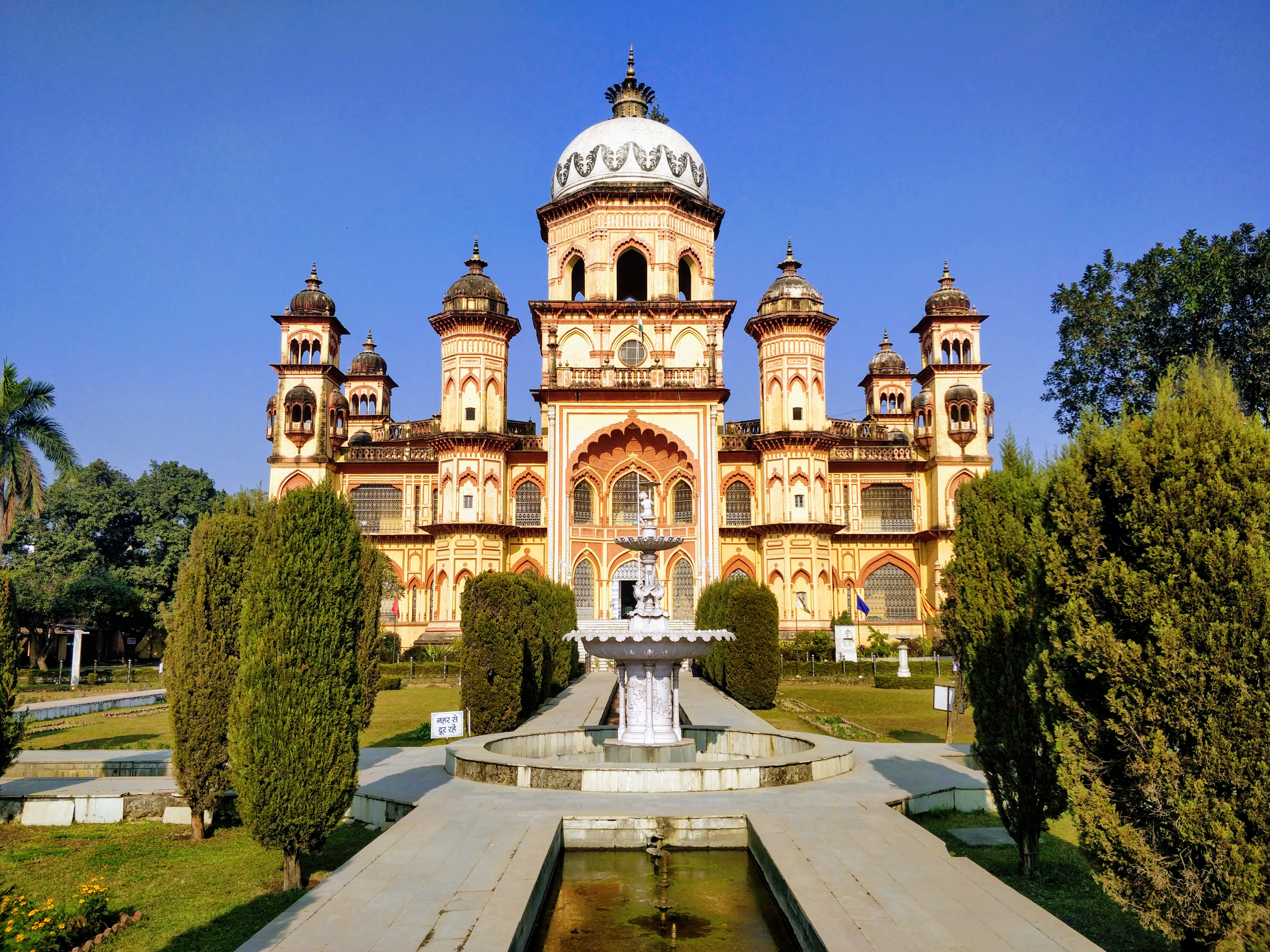
- Front view of Rampur Raza Library
- 28.812327295199776°N 79.0233623495845°E
- Location: Rampur, Uttar Pradesh, India
- Type: Public library

Collection
- Legal deposit: Yes

Other information
- Website: razalibrary.gov.in

The Rampur Raza Library (Romanised: Rāmpur Razā Kitāb Khānah Urdu: رضا کتاب خانہ، رامپور) located in Rampur, Uttar Pradesh, India is a repository of Indo-Islamic cultural heritage established in the last decades of the 18th century. It was built up by successive Nawabs of Rampur and is now managed by the Government of India; the library is named after Raza Ali Khan Bahadur.

It contains a collection of manuscripts, historical documents, specimens of Islamic calligraphy, miniature paintings, astronomical instruments and illustrated works in Arabic and Persian. The Raza Library also contains printed works in Sanskrit, Hindi, Urdu, Pashto (having the original manuscript of the first translation of the Qur'an in addition to other important books/documents), Tamil and Turkish, and approximately 30,000 printed books (including periodicals) in various other languages.

== History ==
Nawab Faizullah Khan, who ruled Rampur from 1774 to 1794, established the library from his personal collection of ancient manuscripts and miniature specimens of Islamic calligraphy in 1774. The succeeding Nawabs were patrons of scholars, poets, painters, calligraphers and musicians, so the library grew rapidly.

Nawab Muhammad Said Khan (1840–1855) preceded his son, Nawab Yousuf Ali Khan Nazim, who was crowned on 1 April 1855. After the Sepoy Mutiny of 1857, many Mughal book collections were destroyed, taken to Britain or dispersed. On the Indian subcontinent, these collections were succeeded by those belonging to the Nawabs and Nizams of Rampur, Avadh, Arcot, Bhopal, Hyderabad and Tonk.

Nawab Kalb Ali Khan (1865–1887) was interested in the collection of rare manuscripts, paintings and specimens of Islamic calligraphy. He was a scholar and poet.

Nawab Mushtaq Ali Khan (1887–1889) preceded Nawab Hamid Ali Khan (1889–1930). Hamid Ali Khan was known for renovating the city's mosque, castle ramparts, and state buildings in Rampur. He also contracted his Chief Engineer W.C. Wright to create a palace named Hamid Manzil in the early 20th century, where he held court. The Raza Library was shifted to this building in 1957.

Raza Ali Khan of Rampur ascended the throne on 21 June 1930. He was educated in India and abroad. He was a progressive from an early age and bolstered education in schools and colleges. He also invited educators to organize these academic institutions. Besides he was a great lover of Indian music for which he purchased several rare manuscripts and books on the subject.

== Current status ==
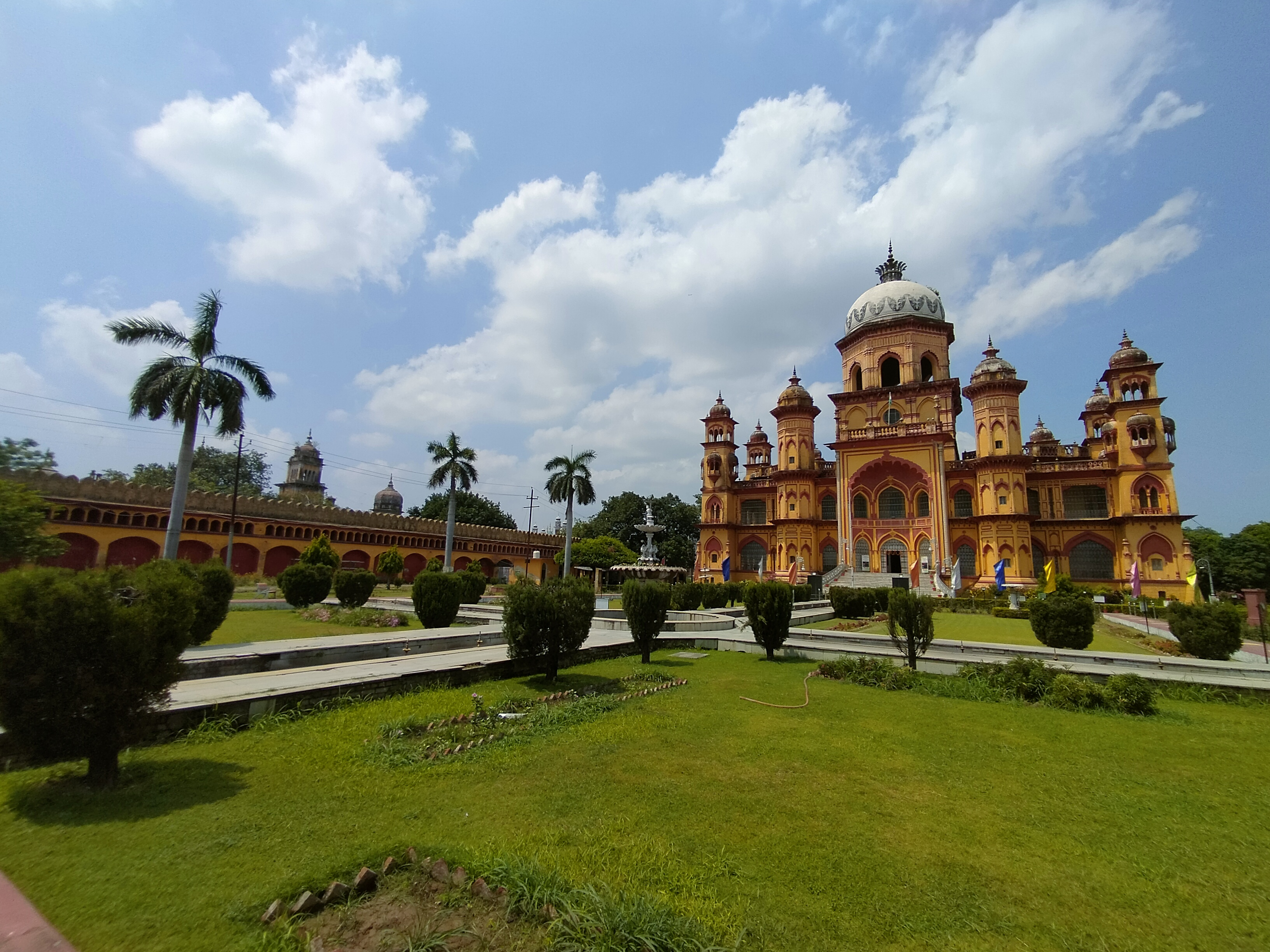
Raza Library, Rampur

After Rampur State joined the Union of India, in 1949 the library was controlled by the management of a Trust which was created on 6 August 1951 by Raza Ali Khan Bahadur. The Trust management continued until July 1975, when the Indian Parliament passed the Raza Library Act.

When the library was taken over by the Central Government, Nawab Syed Murtaza Ali Khan was nominated the vice-chairman of the newly created Board for life under sub-section 5 (1) of the Act. With his death on 8 February 1982, the post of vice-chairman was automatically abolished. Now the library occupies the position of an autonomous institution of national importance under Department of Culture, Government of India and is fully funded by Central Government.

The library is designated as a 'library of national importance' by the Ministry of Education. It is also a designated 'Manuscript Conservation Centre' (MCC) under the National Mission for Manuscripts established in 2003. Commemorative stamps released by the Indian government in 2009.

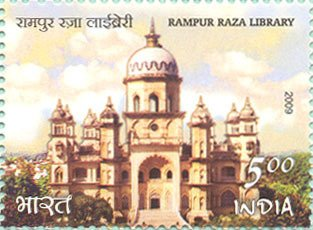

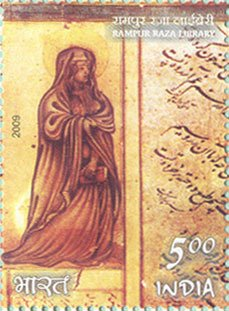

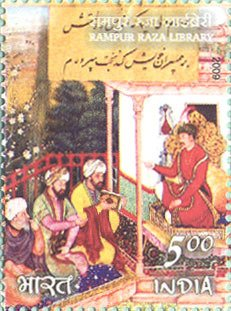

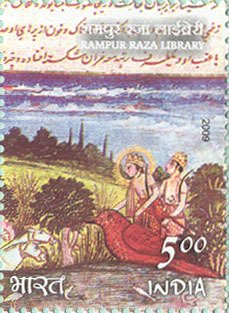
