= Pinki Singh Yadav =

Indian politician

Member of the Uttar Pradesh Legislative Assembly
- Incumbent
- Assumed office March 2012
- Preceded by: New seat
- Constituency: Asmoli

Personal details
- Born: 25 March 1981 (age 45) New Delhi
- Citizenship: Indian
- Party: Samajwadi Party
- Spouse: Pramod Yadav
- Children: 1
- Parent: Brajendra Pal Singh
- Education: Mahatma Jyotiba Phule Rohilkhand University (B. Ed.); Teerthanker Mahaveer University (L.L.B)
- Occupation: Agriculturist, politician

Pinki Singh Yadav is an Indian politician and a member of the 18th Legislative Assembly of Uttar Pradesh, notably serving three terms since 2012. She represents the Asmoli constituency of Uttar Pradesh and is a member of the Samajwadi Party political party.

== Personal life ==
Yadav was born in New Delhi to former minister Brajendra Pal Singh. She completed her Bachelor of Education degree from Mahatma Jyotiba Phule Rohilkhand University and from Teerthanker Mahaveer University attained Bachelor of Laws degree in 2008. She married Pramod Yadav in May 2010, with whom she has a son.

== Political career ==
Yadav has been an MLA for three consecutive terms, being a member of the 16th, 17th and 18th Legislative Assembly of Uttar Pradesh. She represents the Asmoli constituency and is a member of the Samajwadi Party political party.

== See also ==
- Asmoli
- Sixteenth Legislative Assembly of Uttar Pradesh
- Uttar Pradesh Legislative Assembly
