= Chandausi =

- Municipality
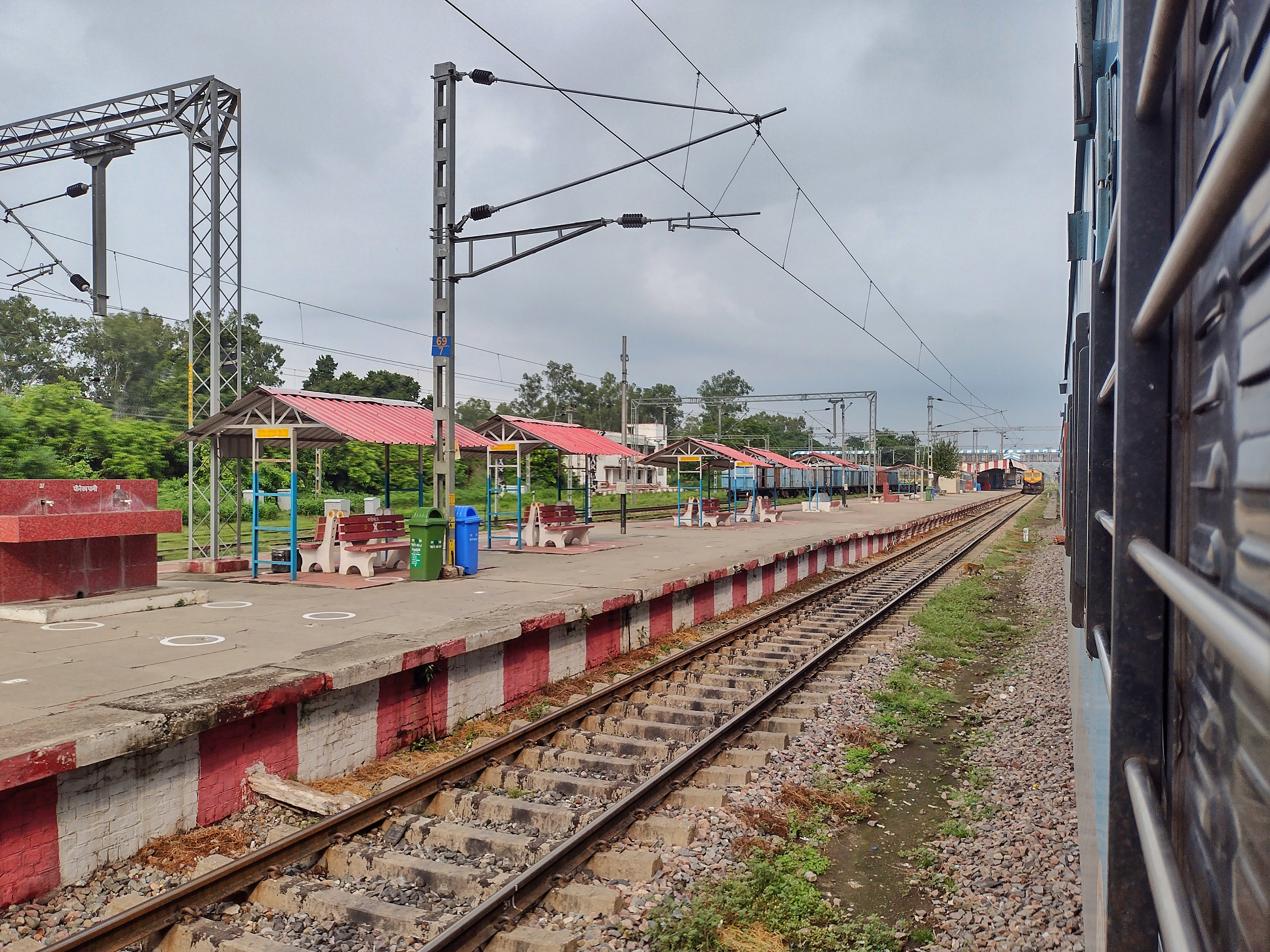
- A platform at the Chandausi Junction railway station
- Nickname: Chanda-si
- Location within Uttar Pradesh
- Coordinates: 28.45°N 78.77°E
- Country: India
- State: Uttar Pradesh
- District: Sambhal
- Elevation: 284 m (932 ft)

Population (2011)
  - Total: 114,383

Languages
  - Official: Hindi
- Time zone: UTC+5:30 (IST)
- PIN: 244412
- Vehicle registration: UP-38

Chandausi is a city and a municipal board in Sambhal district in the state of Uttar Pradesh, India.

The original name of the city was "Chanda Si", meaning "moon-like" (in Indian poetry, the moon is considered to be beautiful). Chandausi is a large town which is approximately 45 km away from the city of Moradabad. It has an average elevation of 284 metres (603 feet). It is 187.5 km from New Delhi.

On 5 September 2017 it was declared by Government that the district and session courts for Sambhal District will be established in Chandausi. Also, the district headquarters of Sambhal district is established in Bahjoi of Chandausi Tehsil.

Zonal Railway Training Institute (ZRTI) at Chandausi, Moradabad UP is the oldest (and North India's only) Railway Training Institute, where group C railway employees like Driver, Guard, Ticket Checker, Station Master, Traffic Inspector, Commercial Inspector, JE (signal & Telecom) etc. are trained for initial, promotional and refresher courses. ZRTI is an ISO 9001 Institute. Applicants pass All India Railway Examinations to get admission into the institute. ZRTI is headed by a senior Civil Services Officer.

== History ==
Chandausi was founded by Rampal chief of Rohilkhand in 1755. Khan enticed several Bania merchants to settle in the town, so that they would carry out trade with the western territories. It later became an important centre for rice and sugar exports to the west.

== Demographics ==
As per provisional data of 2011 census, Chandausi had a population of about 1,14,383 out of which males were 60,256 and females were 54,127. The literacy rate was 72.63 percent.

== Education ==
- N.K.B.M.G Postgraduate College

== Transport ==
Chandausi Junction is situated on Aligarh - Bareilly Railway Route. It is also on a loop line of Lucknow - Moradabad Railway Route. A major railway station Moradabad junction is just 30 mins away from here via railway. line.

Bus services from Kaushambi Bus Depot, Ghaziabad to Chandausi Depot under Uttar Pradesh State Transport Corporation UPSRTC. Buses are also available from Anand Vihar, Noida City Center and Greater Noida to Chandausi.

== Climate ==
The climate of the area is similar to that of the Indo-Gangetic Plain, with hot dry summers and cold winters and an average of 35 inches of rainfall.

- Summer: 45.0 °C (max), 32.5 °C (min)
- Winter: 28.5 °C (max), 3 °C (min)
- Average rainfall: 1143 mm (per year)
