= Asmoli Assembly constituency =

Legislative Assembly constituency in Uttar Pradesh State, India

Coordinates: 28.7°N 78.54°E

Asmoli
- Constituency No. 32 for the Uttar Pradesh Legislative Assembly

Constituency details
- Country: India
- Region: North India
- State: Uttar Pradesh
- District: Sambhal
- Lok Sabha constituency: Sambhal
- Total electors: 379,352
- Reservation: None

Member of Legislative Assembly
- 18th Uttar Pradesh Legislative Assembly
- Incumbent Pinki Singh Yadav
- Party: Samajwadi Party
- Elected year: 2022

Asmoli is a legislative assembly constituency in the Sambhal district of Uttar Pradesh.

== Member of Legislative Assembly ==
Year	Member	Party
Till 2012 : Constituency did not exist
2012	Pinki Singh Yadav	Samajwadi Party
2017	Pinki Singh Yadav	Samajwadi Party
2022	Pinki Singh Yadav	Samajwadi Party

== Election results ==
=== 2027 ===
2027 Uttar Pradesh Legislative Assembly election: Asmoli
Party	Candidate	Votes	%	±%
INDIA				
NDA				
BSP				
AIMIM				
Majority				
Turnout				
gain from		Swing		

=== 2022 ===
2022 Uttar Pradesh Legislative Assembly election: Asmoli
Party	Candidate	Votes	%	±%
SP	Pinki Singh Yadav	111,652	42.92	▲3.88
BJP	Harendra Kumar	86,446	33.23	▲2.64
BSP	Rafatulla Khan	42,512	16.34	▼10.64
AIMIM	Shakeel Ahmed	13,024	5.01	
NOTA	None of the above	1,788	0.69	▼0.06
Majority		25,206	9.69	▲1.24
Turnout		260,152	68.58	▼3.15
SP hold		Swing		

=== 2017 ===
Uttar Pradesh Legislative Assembly Election, 2017: Asmoli
Party	Candidate	Votes	%	±%
SP	Pinki Singh Yadav	97,610	39.04	
BJP	Narendra Singh	76,484	30.59	
BSP	Aqeelur Rehman Khan	67,457	26.98	
NOTA	None of the above	1,872	0.75	
Majority		21,126	8.45	
Turnout		250,045	71.73	

== See also ==
- List of constituencies of the Uttar Pradesh Legislative Assembly
- Sambhal district
