= Sambhal district =

Coordinates: 28.5800°N 78.5500°E

- District of Uttar Pradesh
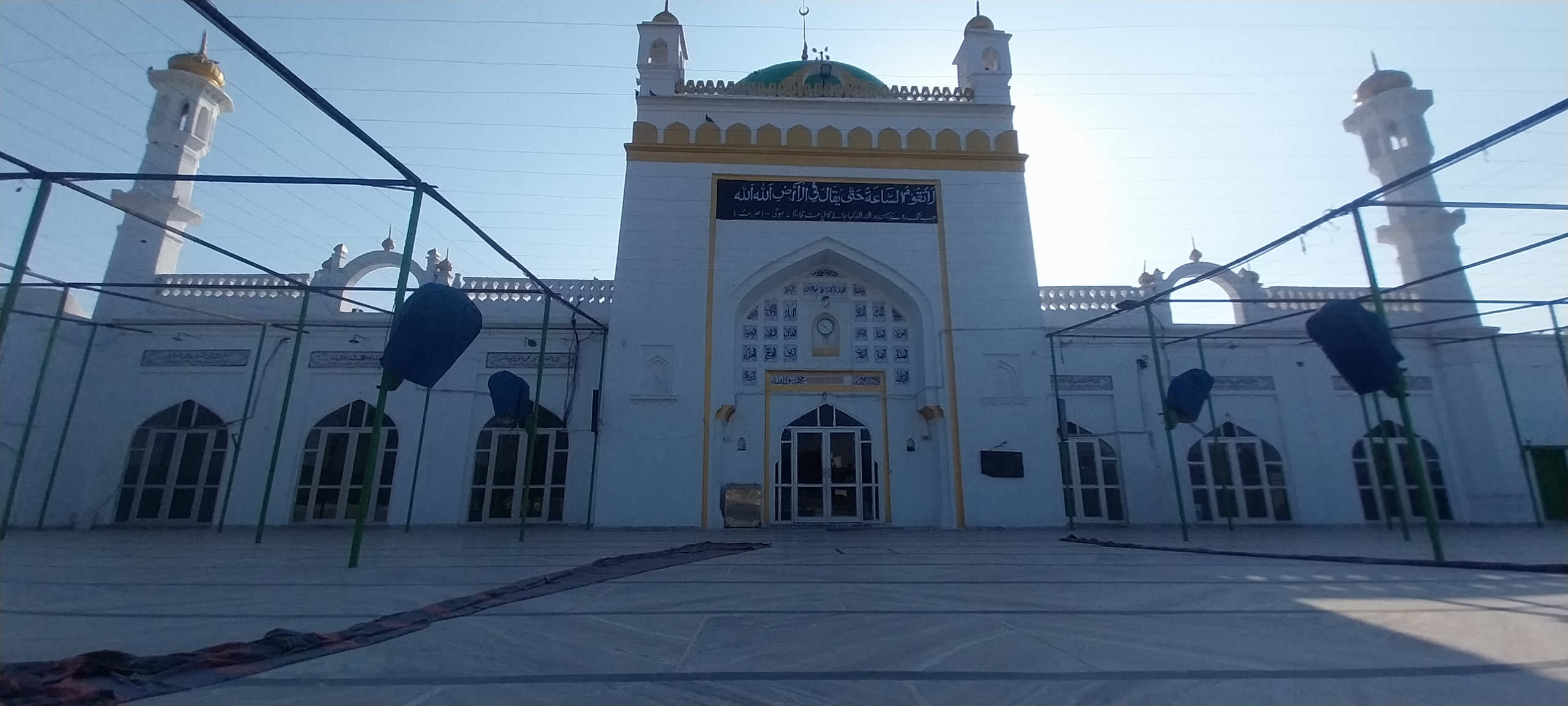
- Shahi Jama Masjid

- Location of Sambhal district in Uttar Pradesh
- Country: India
- State: Uttar Pradesh
- Division: Moradabad
- Administrative Headquarters: Bahjoi
- Judicial Headquarters: Chandausi
- Tehsils: Sambhal, Chandausi, Gunnaur

Government
  - Lok Sabha constituencies: 1. Sambhal (Lok Sabha constituency)- Asmoli, Chandausi, Sambhal; 2. Budaun (Lok Sabha constituency)- Gunnaur
  - Vidhan Sabha constituencies: 1. Sambhal; 2. Asmoli; 3. Chandausi; 4. Gunnaur

Area
  - Total: 2,453.30 km^{2} (947.22 sq mi)

Population (2011)
  - Total: 2,199,774
  - Density: 896.659/km^{2} (2,322.34/sq mi)

Demographics
  - Literacy: 55%
  - Sex ratio: 889
- Time zone: UTC+05:30 (IST)
- Average annual precipitation: 1150 mm
- Website: sambhal.nic.in

Sambhal district, previously called as Bhimnagar district is a district of Uttar Pradesh state in India. The district headquarter is Bahjoi town. Almost 993 villages with 16 police stations fall under Sambhal district.

== History ==
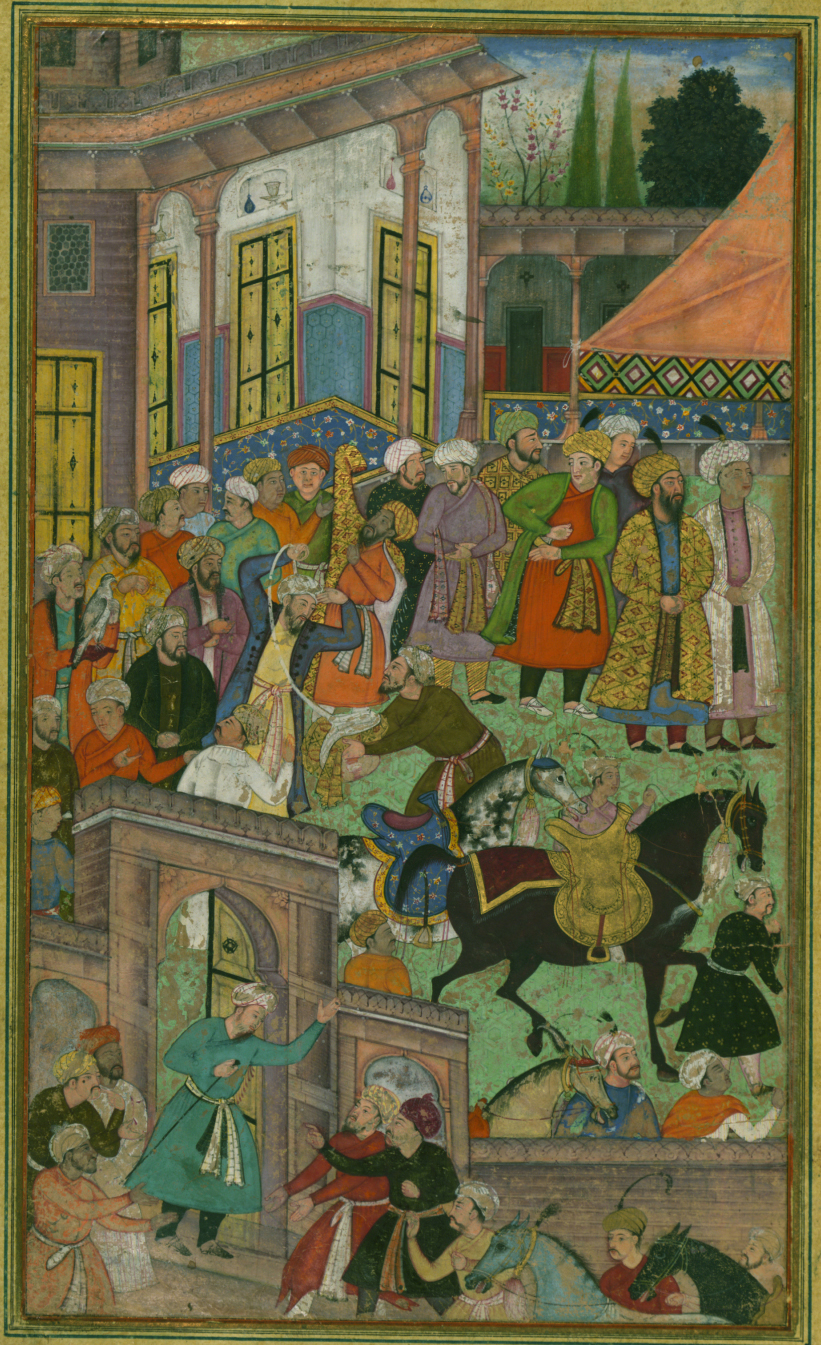
A folio from the Baburnama: An awards ceremony in Sultan Ibrāhīm Lodi's court before an expedition to Sambhal in the early 16th century.

The district was announced on 28 September 2011 and created by the state government out of Moradabad district on 23 July 2012 as one of three new districts in the state. At the time of its creation, the state government decided to name the new district "Bhimnagar" in honour of the social reformer, Bhimrao Ambedkar. However, massive protests broke out in Sambhal town and the adjoining rural areas against the move to rename to the ancient town. Sambhal had been known by the same name for over 500 years, had been an important town in medieval India, and had never had any connection with Bhimrao Ambedkar, a Dalit icon. The protests were successful and the government retained the name of Sambhal.

== Geography ==
The district of Sambhal is part of the Moradabad division in the state of Uttar Pradesh. Bahjoi town serves as its district headquarters. The districts which adjoin Sambhal are (clockwise from north) Amroha, Moradabad, Rampur, Badaun, Aligarh and Bulandshahr.

The nearest major metropolis is New Delhi. Sambhal lies 158.6 kilometres (98.5 mi) due east from New Delhi, past Ghaziabad, Noida and Hapur. The driving time from New Delhi is about 2 hours 40 minutes. Sambhal lies 355 km north-west from the state capital Lucknow.

== Administrative divisions ==
Sambhal district is a part of Moradabad Division. This district is divided into three tehsils: Sambhal, Chandausi, and Gunnaur.

Sambhal district has a single Lok Sabha constituency, the Sambhal constituency. Sambhal district has four Uttar Pradesh Legislative Assembly constituencies: Sambhal, Asmoli, Chandausi and Gunnaur.

== Demographics ==
As per 2011 census, Sambhal district had a population of 2,199,774. The sex ratio as per the census was 891 females for every 1000 males. Literacy rate of Sambhal district is 55%. 468,439 (21.29%) lived in urban areas. Scheduled Castes make up 364,286 (16.56%) of the population.

Religions in Sambhal district (2011)
Religion	Percent
Hinduism	66.66%
Islam	32.88%
Other or not stated	0.46%

Hindus are in majority in the district. Muslims are majority in Sambhal tehsil and dominate urban areas.

Tehsil	Hindus	Muslims	Others
Sambhal	47.29%	52.17%	0.54%
Chandausi	77.85%	21.75%	0.40%
Gunnaur	88.22%	11.39%	0.39%

Languages of Sambhal district (2011)
1. Hindi (83.6%)
2. Urdu (16.3%)
3. Others (0.12%)

At the time of the 2011 Census of India, 80.90% of the population of the district spoke Hindi and 18.57% Urdu as their first language.

== Nearby districts ==
- Amroha district
- Moradabad
- Rampur
- Badaun
- Aligarh
- Bulandshahr
