= Moradabad division =

Administrative division of Uttar Pradesh, India

Coordinates: 28.8400°N 78.7600°E

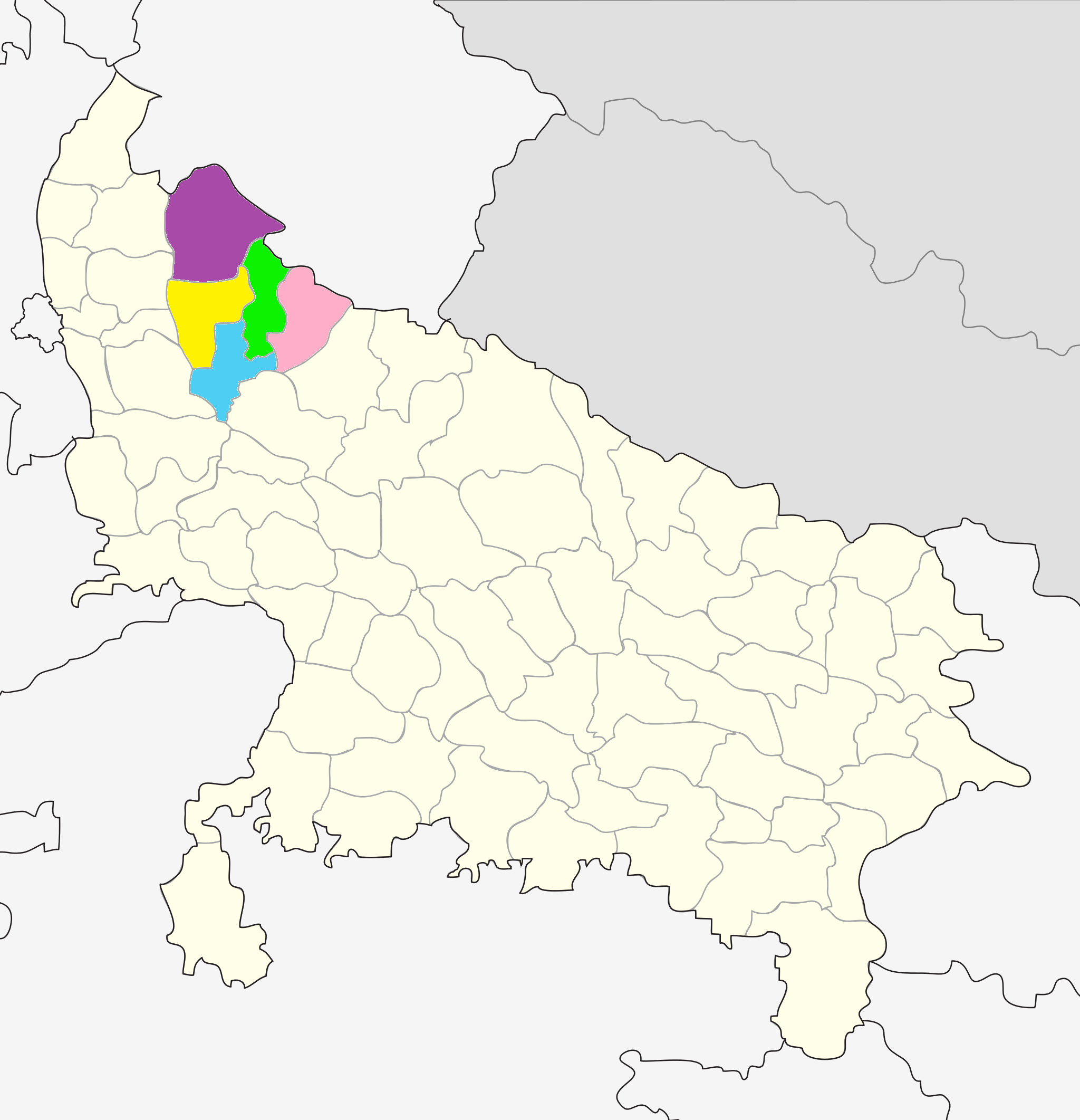
Different districts of Moradabad division Sambhal Rampur Bijnor Amroha Moradabad

Moradabad division (Hindi pronunciation: [mʊɾaːd̪aːbaːd̪]) is one of the 18 administrative geographical units (i.e. division) of the northern Indian state of Uttar Pradesh. Moradabad city is the administrative headquarters of this division. The railways too have a Moradabad division, which is part of Northern Railways.

The Moradabad division in Uttar Pradesh, forms a part of the Rohilkhand region. As of 2005, the division consists of five districts:-

- Moradabad
- Bijnor
- Rampur
- Amroha
- Sambhal

== Demography ==
Total population of Moradabad Division is 13,185,034. Among them, Hindus are 5,398,907, Muslims are 5 828,458 and 1,957,679 follow other religions.

Religion in Moradabad Division (2011)
1. Hinduism (50.6%)
2. Islam (44.2%)
3. Others (5.20%)

| District | Hindu % | Muslim % | Other |
|---|---|---|---|
| Moradabad | 48.32 | 50.80 | 0.88 |
| Rampur | 45.97 | 50.57 | 3.46 |
| Sambhal | 66.66 | 32.88 | 0.46 |
| Amroha | 58.44 | 40.78 | 0.78 |
| Bijnor | 55.18 | 43.04 | 1.78 |
