= Rampur Lok Sabha constituency =

Lok Sabha constituency in Uttar Pradesh

Coordinates: 25.47°N 82.58°E

Rampur UP-7
- Lok Sabha constituency
- Interactive Map Outlining Rampur Lok Sabha constituency

Constituency details
- Country: India
- Region: North India
- State: Uttar Pradesh
- Assembly constituencies: Swar; Chamraua; Bilaspur; Rampur; Milak
- Established: 1952
- Total electors: 17,31,836
- Reservation: None

Member of Parliament
- 18th Lok Sabha
- Incumbent Mohibbullah Nadvi
- Party: SP
- Alliance: INDIA
- Elected year: 2024

Rampur Lok Sabha constituency (Hindi pronunciation: [ɾaːmpʊɾ]) is one of the 80 Lok Sabha (parliamentary) constituencies in Uttar Pradesh state in northern India.

== Assembly segments ==
Presently, Rampur Lok Sabha constituency comprises five Vidhan Sabha (legislative assembly) segments. These are:

No	Name	District	Member	Party	2024 Lead
34	Swar	Rampur	Shafeek Ahmed Ansari (Note: Shafeek Ahmed Ansari of Apna Dal (Sonelal) won Swar assembly segment in 2023 by-elections in May 2023)	AD(S)	SP
35	Chamraua	Rampur	Naseer Ahmad Khan	SP	SP
36	Bilaspur	Rampur	Baldev Singh Aulakh	BJP	BJP
37	Rampur	Rampur	Akash Saxena (Note: Akash Saxena of the BJP won Rampur assembly segment in 2022 by-elections in December 2022.)	BJP	SP
38	Milak (SC)	Rampur	Rajbala Singh	BJP	BJP

== Members of Parliament ==
Indian National Congress is the most successful political party in Rampur Lok Sabha elections.
1. INC (10 terms) (52.6%)
2. BJP (4 terms) (21.1%)
3. SP (4 terms) (21.1%)
4. JP (1 term) (5.26%)

Year	Name	Party
1952	Maulana Abul Kalam Azad	Indian National Congress
1957	Adv. Syed Ahmad Mehdi	Indian National Congress
1962	Adv. Syed Ahmad Mehdi	Indian National Congress
1967	Zulfiquar Ali Khan	Indian National Congress
1971	Zulfiquar Ali Khan	Indian National Congress
1977	Rajendra Kumar Sharma	Janata Party
1980	Zulfiquar Ali Khan	Indian National Congress
1984	Zulfiquar Ali Khan	Indian National Congress
1989	Zulfiquar Ali Khan	Indian National Congress
1991	Rajendra Kumar Sharma	Bharatiya Janata Party
1996	Begum Noor Bano	Indian National Congress
1998	Mukhtar Abbas Naqvi	Bharatiya Janata Party
1999	Begum Noor Bano	Indian National Congress
2004	Jaya Prada	Samajwadi Party
2009	Jaya Prada	Samajwadi Party
2014	Naipal Singh	Bharatiya Janata Party
2019	Azam Khan	Samajwadi Party
2022^	Ghanshyam Singh Lodhi	Bharatiya Janata Party
2024	Mohibbullah Nadvi	Samajwadi Party

^ By-poll

== Election results ==
=== 2024 ===
2024 Indian general election: Rampur
Party	Candidate	Votes	%	±%
SP	Mohibbullah Nadvi	481,503	49.74	▲3.74
BJP	Ghanshyam Singh Lodhi	3,94,069	40.71	▼11.25
BSP	Zeeshan Khan	79,692	8.23	▲8.23
NOTA	None of the Above	5,653	0.58	▼0.05
Majority		87,434	9.03	▼22.37
Turnout		9,68,079	55.90	▲24.40
SP gain from BJP		Swing		

=== 2022 by-election ===
By-election, 2022: Rampur
Party	Candidate	Votes	%	±%
BJP	Ghanshyam Singh Lodhi	367,397	51.96	▲9.62
SP	Mohammad Asim Raza	3,25,205	46.00	▼6.71
NOTA	None of the Above	4,450	0.63	▲0.01
Majority		42,192	5.96	▼4.41
Turnout		7,07,084	31.40	▼31.79
BJP gain from SP		Swing	+8.16	

=== General election 2019 ===
2019 Indian general election: Rampur
Party	Candidate	Votes	%	±%
SP	Mohammad Azam Khan	559,177	52.71	▲9.28
BJP	Jaya Prada	4,49,180	42.34	▲4.92
INC	Sanjay Kapoor	35,009	3.30	▼13.03
NOTA	None of the Above	6,577	0.62	▼0.10
Majority		1,09,997	10.37	
Turnout		10,61,238	63.19	▲3.92
SP gain from BJP		Swing	+2.18	

=== General election 2014 ===
2014 Indian general election: Rampur
Party	Candidate	Votes	%	±%
BJP	Naipal Singh	358,616	37.42	▲27.27
SP	Naseer Ahmad Khan	3,35,181	34.98	▼3.08
INC	Nawab Kazim Ali Khan	1,56,466	16.33	▼16.63
BSP	Akbar Husain	81,006	8.45	▼7.24
AIMF	Jannat Nisha	4,473	0.47	▲0.47
NOTA	None of the Above	6,905	0.72	▲0.72
Majority		23,435	2.44	▼2.66
Turnout		9,58,336	59.27	▲6.77
BJP gain from SP		Swing	▼0.64	

== See also ==
- Rampur district
- List of constituencies of the Lok Sabha
