= Bilaspur =

Bilaspur may refer to:

== Places in India ==
- Bilaspur, Bihar, a village in Mairwa community development block
- Bilaspur district, Chhattisgarh
  - Bilaspur, Chhattisgarh, administrative headquarters of the district
  - Bilaspur Lok Sabha constituency, a parliamentary constituency
  - Bilaspur, Chhattisgarh Assembly constituency, a legislative assembly constituency
  - Bilaspur Junction railway station
- Bilaspur, Haryana, a town in Yamunanagar district, Haryana
- Bilaspur district, Himachal Pradesh
  - Bilaspur, Himachal Pradesh, a city and a municipal council in Bilaspur district
  - Bilaspur (Himachal Pradesh Assembly constituency), a legislative assembly constituency
  - Bilaspur State, one of the princely states of India, also known as Kahlur
  - Bilaspur State (1950–54), a state within the Union of India from 1950 to 1956
- Bilaspur, Madhya Pradesh, a village in Umaria district
- Bilaspur, Ganjam, a village in Ganjam district of Odisha
- Bilaspur, Punjab, a village in Moga district of Punjab, India
- Bilaspur, Tripura Assembly constituency, a former legislative assembly constituency in Tripura
- Bilaspur, Rampur, a town in Rampur district, Uttar Pradesh
- Bilaspur, Gautam Buddh Nagar, a village in Gautam Buddh Nagar district, Uttar Pradesh
- Bilaspur, Uttar Pradesh, a town in Muzaffarnagar district, Uttar Pradesh
  - Bilaspur, Uttar Pradesh Assembly constituency
  - Bilaspur Road railway station

== Other uses ==
- Bilaspur Airport, located at the village of Chakarbhatta, outside of Bilaspur, Chhattisgarh
- Bilaspur University, Bilaspur, Chhattisgarh
- Bilaspur, a fictional village in Bihar in the 1997 film Mrityudand

== See also ==
- Bilaspuri, Indo-Aryan language spoken in Bilaspur, Himachal Pradesh
- Bilaspur Assembly constituency (disambiguation)
- Bilaspur district (disambiguation)
