= Rajendra Kumar Sharma (politician) =

Indian politician

Member of Parliament, Lok Sabha
- In office 1991–1996
- Preceded by: Zulfiquar Ali Khan
- Succeeded by: Begum Noor Bano
- Constituency: Rampur
- In office 1977–1980
- Preceded by: Zulfiquar Ali Khan
- Succeeded by: Zulfiquar Ali Khan
- Constituency: Rampur

Member of Uttar Pradesh Legislative Assembly
- In office 1969–1974
- Preceded by: Maqsood Hussain
- Succeeded by: Syed Murtaza Alli Khan
- Constituency: Suar

Personal details
- Born: 24 January 1940 Majitha, Amritsar district
- Died: 20 August 2020 (aged 80)
- Party: Samajwadi Party
- Other political affiliations: Bharatiya Janata Party
- Spouse: Renu Sharma (m. 1968)
- Children: 1 son, 3 daughters
- Parent: Gyan Chand Sharma (father)
- Education: Master of Arts; Bachelor of Laws; Doctor of Public Administration
- Alma mater: Agra University; Lucknow University

Rajendra Kumar Sharma (1940–2020) was an Indian politician from Uttar Pradesh who had represented Rampur in the Lok Sabha from 1977 to 1980 and 1991 to 1996. He had represented Suar in the Uttar Pradesh Legislative Assembly from 1969 to 1974.
