= Akash Saxena =

Indian politician (born 1975)

Member of the Uttar Pradesh legislative assembly
- Incumbent
- Assumed office 8 December 2022
- Preceded by: Azam Khan
- Constituency: Rampur

Personal details
- Born: 1975 (age 50–51) Rampur, Uttar Pradesh, India
- Party: Bharatiya Janata Party
- Parent: Shiv Bahadur Saxena
- Occupation: MLA
- Profession: Politician

Akash Saxena (born 1975) is an Indian politician. He represents the Rampur Assembly constituency of Uttar Pradesh, India. He won the assembly Rampur by-election in December 2022, defeating Samajwadi Party candidate Asim Raza by more than 33,000 votes.

== Personal life ==
He is the son of former BJP MLA & UP's Cabinet Minister Shiv Bahadur Saxena. The BJP-led state government of Uttar Pradesh has given him a Y category security since 2018.

== Political career ==
Saxena contested 2022 Uttar Pradesh Legislative Assembly election as Bharatiya Janata Party candidate from Rampur Assembly constituency and defeated his close contestant Mohd. Asim Raja from Samajwadi Party with a margin of 33,772 votes. From 8 December 2022 he has become member of the 18th Legislative Assembly of Uttar Pradesh.

He has served as the Convener of the Bharatiya Janata Party's Small-Scale Industries Cell for Western Uttar Pradesh. Akash Saxena was the president of the Indian Industries Association, Rampur.

=== March 2022 assembly election ===
In March 2022 assembly election, Akash Saxena secured 76,084 votes for BJP, defeating SP's Mohd. Asim Raza bypoll candidate by a margin of 33,702 votes

== Posts held ==
#	From	To	Position	Comments
01	2022	till date	Member, 18th Legislative Assembly of Uttar Pradesh	Elected in Bypoll

== Judicial activism ==
Akash Saxena has filed more than 60 cases against Samajwadi Party leader and former UP minister Azam Khan, which become a significant reason for Azam Khan and his son Abdullah Azam Khan to go to jail. He filed a complaint alleging MLA Abdullah Azam Khan had obtained multiple birth certificates to increase his age to the eligibility limit for contesting state assembly elections. Based on his complaint, upon investigation by the Rampur District Magistrate found Abdullah Khan guilty of faking his date of birth to contest polls. The report was sent to the Election Commission of India. In January 2019, Saxena further lodged a case of forgery in the birth certificate case at a local police station. In January 2020, the court declared the three, Azam Khan, Abdullah Zam Khan and Tazeen Fatma, to be absconders for failing to appear in court during the hearings of the case. On 26 February 2020, Azam Khan and her wife, Tazeen Fatma and son Abdullah Khan were sent to jail for making a fake birth certificate.

In March 2021, Saxena complained about Mohammad Ali Jauhar University's funding. He alleged that the highest donation had been shown in the balance sheets of 2015, 2016, and 2017 at the time of demonetization when Azam Khan was a minister. The donation of Rs 222 crore is shown in the balance sheet, whereas the income tax returns of the people who donated money show that they were not capable of giving that much donation. Saxena asked where did this money come from then. Akash Saxena provided the balance sheet of Jauhar University to the Enforcement Directorate (ED), and the money laundering case is being investigated.

In 2019, Akash Saxena filed a complaint against Azam Khan for delivering hate speech, alleging that Khan was trying to incite violence between Hindus and Muslims. In the same hate speech case, Khan was convicted in 2022 and his legislatorship from the state assembly was terminated.
