= Tazeen Fatma =

Indian politician

Professor Dr. Tazeen Fatma
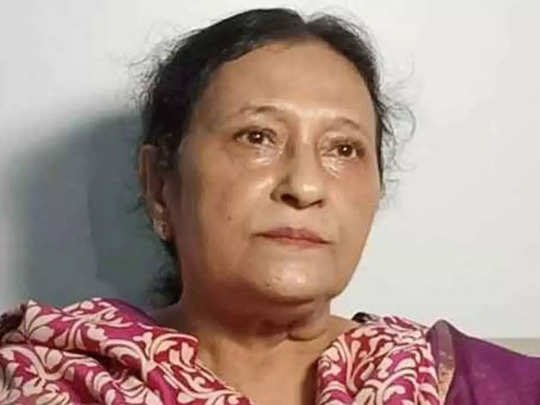

Member of the Uttar Pradesh Legislative Assembly
- In office 24 October 2019 – 10 March 2022
- Preceded by: Azam Khan
- Succeeded by: Azam Khan
- Constituency: Rampur

Member of Parliament, Rajya Sabha
- In office 26 November 2014 – 24 October 2019
- Succeeded by: Arun Singh
- Constituency: Uttar Pradesh

Pro Vice Chancellor of the Mohammad Ali Jauhar University
- Incumbent
- Assumed office 2012
- Vice-Chancellor: Prof. Sultan Mohammad Khan
- Preceded by: Azam Khan

Personal details
- Born: 10 March 1949 (age 77) Bilgram Hardoi, Uttar Pradesh India
- Party: Samajwadi Party
- Spouse: Azam Khan (m. 1981)
- Children: 2 (including Abdullah Azam Khan)
- Education: Aligarh Muslim University (M.A., M.Phil., Ph.D.)
- Profession: Professor, Political

Tazeen Fatma is an Indian politician from the state of Uttar Pradesh. She belongs to the Samajwadi Party and is a member of Uttar Pradesh Legislative Assembly from Rampur assembly constituency of Rampur district. She is pro-vice-chancellor of Mohammad Ali Jauhar University.

== Early life and education ==
Fatma was born on 10 March 1949 to Mohammad Abdul Qaiyoom and Asghari Khatoon in Bilgram, a village in Hardoi district of Uttar Pradesh, India. She attended Aligarh Muslim University and obtained M.A., M.Phil., and Ph.D.

She started working as associate professor in Political science in the department of education.

Tazeen married Azam Khan in 1981 and has two sons, Abdullah and Abeed. Azam Khan is also a member of the Samajwadi Party and a former minister in the Uttar Pradesh Government.

== Politics ==
In October 2014, Fatma was offered a nomination to the Rajya Sabha by Samajwadi party, which she refused citing that her husband had not been given due consideration by the party. Later, in November, she accepted the offer and became member of the Rajya Sabha.

In January 2015, she was nominated to a committee on social justice and empowerment. She and her husband were accused of procuring multiple birth certificates made in Rampur and Lucknow for their son Abdullah to get two passports. A BJP leader filed a complaint in this matter in January 2019.

== Controversies ==
=== Land encroachment ===
Tazeen Fatma, along with her son Abdullah Azam Khan, got a notice for encroaching upon farmers' land to construct Mohammad Ali Jauhar University on 9 September 2019. She was also booked under section 447 and 184 of Indian Penal Code for encroaching on government land to build Humsafar resort.

=== Electricity theft ===
During the raids, officials found that Azam Khan and Tazeen had installed equipment being used, which they were able to illegally consume electricity beyond the installed capacity of their power meter. Therefore, officials booked a first information report against Tazeen for stealing electricity on 6 September 2019.

=== Fake birth certificate ===
On 26 February 2020, Tazeen Fatma, along with her husband and her son, were sent to jail for making a fake birth certificate.

=== Bail ===
On 29 May 2024, she was released from jail.
