= Shiv Bahadur Saxena =

Indian politician

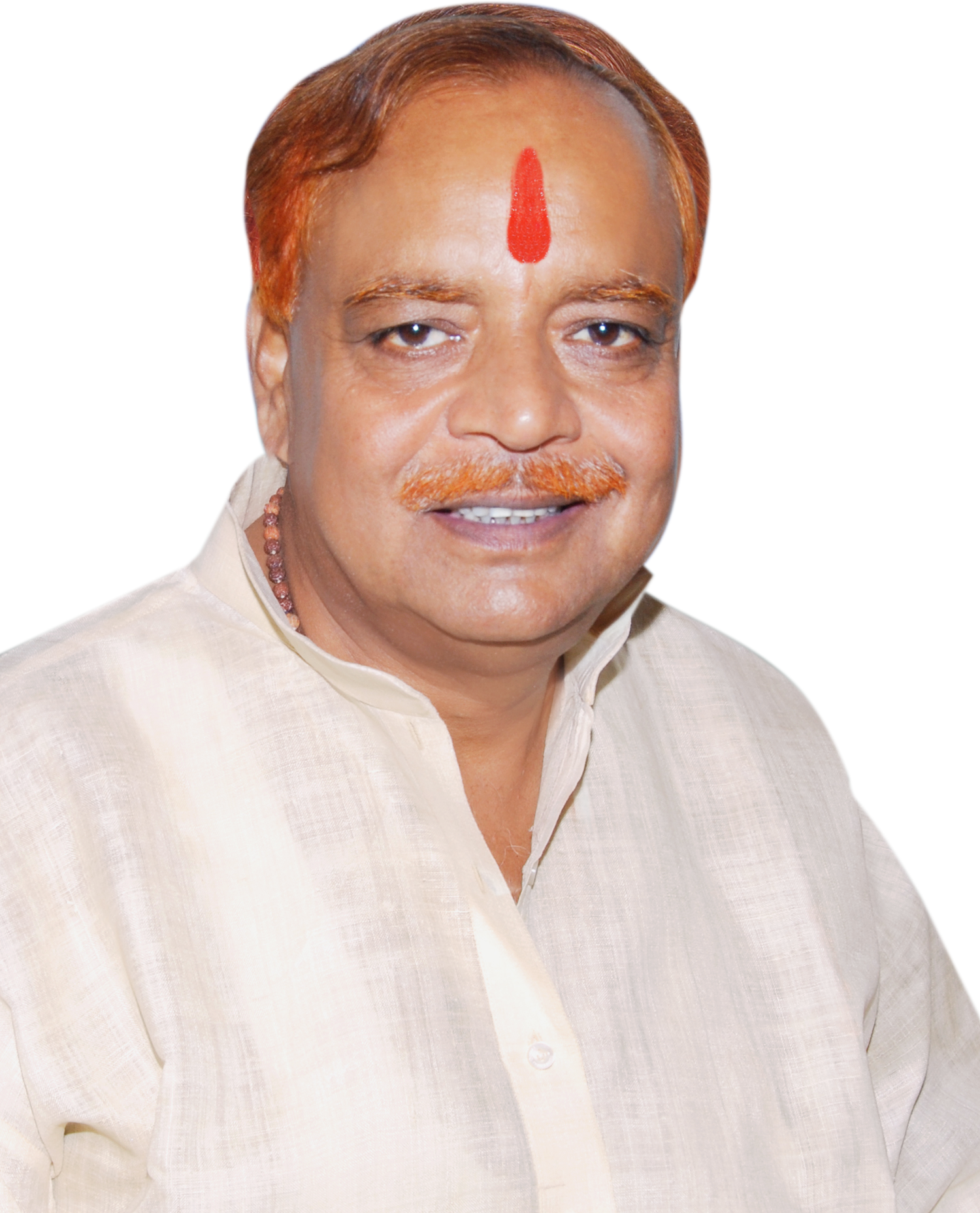

Personal details
- Born: 15 June 1952 (age 73) Rampur, Uttar Pradesh, India

Shiv Bahadur Saxena (born 15 June 1952) is an Indian politician who served as Minister of Sugar Industry and Sugarcane Development in Uttar Pradesh under Bharatiya Janata Party Govt led by Kalyan Singh.

== Early life ==
Shiv Bahadur was born on 15 June 1952 in Rampur, Uttar Pradesh in a Kayasth Hindu family of businessmen to parents Shamsher Bahadur Saxena and Tara Devi Saxena. His son Akash Saxena is currently the BJP MLA from Rampur UP.

== Political career ==
Shiv Bahadur started his political career in 1980 during the formation of BJP.

In 1989, he was first elected as MLA from Suar (Assembly constituency) in Uttar Pradesh. He consecutively won the election from the same area in 1991, 1992, and 1996.
