= Bilaspur Assembly constituency =

Bilaspur Assembly constituency may refer to:

- Bilaspur, Chhattisgarh Assembly constituency
- Bilaspur, Himachal Pradesh Assembly constituency
- Bilaspur, Uttar Pradesh Assembly constituency
- Bilaspur, Tripura Assembly constituency
