= Rampur, Uttar Pradesh Assembly constituency =

Constituency of the Uttar Pradesh legislative assembly in India

Rampur
- Constituency No. 37 for the Uttar Pradesh Legislative Assembly

Constituency details
- Country: India
- Region: North India
- State: Uttar Pradesh
- District: Rampur
- Lok Sabha constituency: Rampur
- Total electors: 318,714 (2012)
- Reservation: None

Member of Legislative Assembly
- 18th Uttar Pradesh Legislative Assembly
- Incumbent Akash Saxena
- Party: Bharatiya Janata Party
- Elected year: 2022

Rampur is one of the 403 constituencies of the Uttar Pradesh Legislative Assembly, India. It is a part of the Rampur district and one of the five assembly constituencies in the Rampur Lok Sabha constituency. First election in this assembly constituency was held in 1951 after the delimitation order (DPACO - 1951) was passed in 1951. The constituency was assigned identification number 37 after "Delimitation of Parliamentary and Assembly Constituencies Order, 2008" was passed in the year 2008.

== Wards / Areas ==
Extent of Rampur Assembly constituency is Panwaria & Rampur MB of Rampur Tehsil.

== Members of the Legislative Assembly ==
Election	Name	Party
1952	Fazal- Ul- Haq	Indian National Congress
1957	Fazal- Ul- Haq	Independent politician
1962	Fazal- Ul- Haq	Indian National Congress
1967	Fazal- Ul- Haq	Swatantra Party
1969	Fazal- Ul- Haq	Indian National Congress
1974	Fazal- Ul- Haq	Indian National Congress
1977	Fazal- Ul- Haq	Indian National Congress
1980	Azam Khan	Janata Party (Secular)
1985	Azam Khan	Lok Dal
1989	Azam Khan	Janata Dal
1991	Azam Khan	Janata Party
1993	Azam Khan	Samajwadi Party
1996	Azam Khan	Indian National Congress
2002	Azam Khan	Samajwadi Party
2007	Azam Khan	Samajwadi Party
2012	Azam Khan	Samajwadi Party
2017	Azam Khan	Samajwadi Party
2019^	Azam Khan	Samajwadi Party
2022	Azam Khan	Samajwadi Party
2022^	Akash Saxena	Bharatiya Janata Party

== Election results ==
=== 2022 bypoll ===
2022 Uttar Pradesh Legislative Assembly by-election: Rampur
Party	Candidate	Votes	%	±%
BJP	Akash Saxena	81,432	62.06	+27.44
SP	Mohammad Adeeb Qureshi	47,296	36.05	−23.66
NOTA	None of the Above	726	0.55	+0.02
Majority		34,136	26.01	
Turnout		1,31,225	27.83	−51.82
BJP gain from SP		Swing		

=== 2022 ===
2022 Uttar Pradesh Legislative Assembly election: Rampur
Party	Candidate	Votes	%	±%
SP	Azam Khan	131,225	59.71	▲12.24
BJP	Akash Saxena	76,084	34.62	▲8.93
BSP	Sadaqat Hussain	4,940	2.25	▼22.97
INC	Muhammad Kazim Ali Khan	4,000	1.82	
NOTA	None of the above	1,168	0.53	▼0.03
Majority		55,141	25.09	▲3.31
Turnout		219,757	56.61	▲0.29
SP hold		Swing		

=== 2019 bypoll ===
By-Election, 2019: Rampur
Party	Candidate	Votes	%	±%
SP	Adeeb Qureshi	79,043	49.13	
BJP	Bharat Bhushan	71,327	44.34	
INC	Arshad Ali Khan	4,182	2.60	
BSP	Zubair Masood Khan	3,441	2.14	
IND.	Javed khan	1,089	0.68	
None of the Above	None of the Above	1,289	0.80	
Majority		7,716	4.79	
Turnout		1,60,904	41.15	
SP hold		Swing		

=== 2017 ===
2017 Uttar Pradesh Legislative Assembly election: Rampur
Party	Candidate	Votes	%	±%
SP	Azam Khan	102,100	47.47	
BJP	Shiv Bahadur Saxena	55,258	25.69	
BSP	Dr. Tanveer Ahmed Khan	54,248	25.22	
NOTA	None of the above	1,191	0.56	
Majority		46,842	21.78	
Turnout		215,073	56.32	
SP hold		Swing		

=== 2012 ===
2012 Uttar Pradesh Legislative Assembly election: Rampur
Party	Candidate	Votes	%	±%
SP	Mohammad Azam Khan	95,772	55.31	−
INC	Dr. Tanveer Ahmad Khan	32,503	18.77	−
BSP	Bharat Bhushan	16,570	9.57	−
	Remainder 10 candidates	28,317	16.37	−
Majority		63,269	36.54	−
Turnout		1,73,162	54.33	−
SP hold		Swing		

== See also ==
- Government of Uttar Pradesh
- List of constituencies of the Uttar Pradesh Legislative Assembly
- Rampur district
- Rampur Lok Sabha constituency
