= Abdullah Azam Khan =

Indian politician (born 1990)

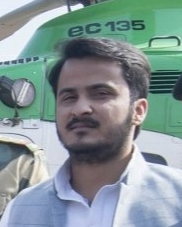

Member of the Uttar Pradesh Legislative Assembly
- In office 11 March 2017 – 13 February 2023
- Preceded by: Muhammad Kazim Ali Khan
- Succeeded by: Shafeek Ahmed Ansari
- Constituency: Swar

Personal details
- Born: 30 September 1990 (age 36) Rampur, Uttar Pradesh, India
- Party: Samajwadi Party
- Parents: Azam Khan (father); Tazeen Fatma (mother)
- Education: Uttar Pradesh Technical University; Galgotias University
- Profession: Politician

Mohammad Abdullah Azam Khan is an Indian politician and was a member of the 17th Legislative Assembly of Uttar Pradesh. He represented the Swar constituency of Uttar Pradesh's Rampur district before being disqualified by the high court. He is a member of the Samajwadi Party. He is the son of senior Samajwadi Party leader Azam Khan.

== Early life and education ==
Abdullah Azam was born to Azam Khan and Tazeen Fatma. He completed his Bachelor of Technology from Uttar Pradesh Technical University and Master of Technology from Galgotias University in 2015.

== Political career ==
He became an MLA in 2017. He represented Rampur district's Swar constituency and is a member of the Samajwadi Party. He was disqualified as MLA due to a discrepancy in the Election affidavit by Allahabad High Court on 16 December 2019. Again he has been suspended effective from 13 February 2023 and now the Suar seat of Rampur is vacant till the next by-election.

== Controversies and legal issues ==
=== Birth certificate controversy ===
A local RSS leader Aakash Saxena filed a complaint alleging Abdullah had obtained multiple birth certificates to increase his age to the eligibility limit for contesting state assembly elections. On basis of this complaint, upon investigation by the Rampur district magistrate found Abdullah guilty of faking his date of birth to contest polls. The report was sent to the election commission. In January 2019, Saxena further lodged a case of forgery in the birth certificate case at a local police station. In March 2019, the UP high court stayed the arrest of Abdullah and his father Azam Khan and mother Tazeen Fatma until the probe was completed by the police.

On 15 January 2022, Abdullah came out of jail over anticipatory bail.

=== Land grabbing ===
On 9 September 2019, Abdullah along with his mother Tazeen Fatma got a notice for allegedly grabbing land of farmers to build Mohammad Ali Jauhar University. Abdullah was also booked under section 447 and 184 for allegedly encroaching on the government land for his Humasafar Resort.

Dual PAN Card case conviction

On November 17, 2025, He and his father Azam Khan were convicted and sentenced to jail terms of up to seven years by a special MP/MLA court in a 2019 case related to obtaining two PAN cards using different dates of birth, a prosecution officer said.

== See also ==
- Uttar Pradesh Legislative Assembly
