= Dargah Hafiz Shah Jamalullah =

Sufi shrine in India

Dargah Hafiz Shah Jamalullah is a Sufi shrine of Shah Jamalullah Rampuri, a Sufi saint who is often known as Badhsah-e-Rohilkhand (transl. The King of Rohilkhand).

The shrine is around 250 years old. It is situated in the Roshanbagh area of Rampur district, Uttar Pradesh.
