= Ghanshyam Singh Lodhi =

Indian politician

Member of Parliament, Lok Sabha
- In office 26 June 2022 – 4 June 2024
- Preceded by: Azam Khan
- Succeeded by: Mohibbullah
- Constituency: Rampur

Member of Uttar Pradesh Legislative Council
- In office 2004–2010
- In office 2016–2022

Personal details
- Born: 6 May 1967 (age 59) Khairullapur, Uttar Pradesh, India
- Party: Bharatiya Janata Party
- Other political affiliations: Samajwadi Party; Rashtriya Kranti Party
- Parent: Dauli Ram

Ghanshyam Singh Lodhi (born 6 May 1967) is an Indian politician who served as a Member of the Uttar Pradesh Legislative Council from 2004 to 2010 representing Rashtriya Kranti Party of Kalyan Singh and 2016 to 2022 representing the Samajwadi Party. He won Rampur Lok Sabha bypolls in 2022 representing the Bharatiya Janata Party

Lok Sabha
Preceded by Azam Khan	Member of Parliament for Rampur; 2022 – Present	Incumbent
