= Junedpur =

Village in Uttar Pradesh, India

Coordinates: 28.3633°N 77.6027°E

Junedpur is a village in Greater Noida, Uttar Pradesh, India. It is located near Buddh International Circuit and Galgotia University.
