= Chamraua Assembly constituency =

Constituency of the Uttar Pradesh legislative assembly in India

35. Chamraua; ३५. चमरव्वा
- Constituency No. 35 for the Uttar Pradesh Legislative Assembly

Constituency details
- Country: India
- Region: North India
- State: Uttar Pradesh
- District: Rampur
- Lok Sabha constituency: Rampur
- Total electors: 299,126 (2017)
- Reservation: None

Member of Legislative Assembly
- 18th Uttar Pradesh Legislative Assembly
- Incumbent Naseer Ahmad Khan
- Party: Samajwadi Party
- Elected year: 2022

Chamraua Assembly constituency is one of the 403 constituencies of the Uttar Pradesh Legislative Assembly, India. It is a part of the Rampur district and one of the five assembly constituencies in the Rampur Lok Sabha constituency. First election in this assembly constituency was held in 2008 after "Delimitation of Parliamentary and Assembly Constituencies Order, 2008" was passed in the year 2008. The constituency is assigned identification number 35.

== Wards / Areas ==
Extent of Chamraua Assembly constituency is KC Matkhera of Suar Tehsil; KCs Saidnagar & Chamraua of Rampur Tehsil.

== Members of the Legislative Assembly ==
Year	Member	Party
Till 2012 : Constituency did not exist
2012	Ali Yusuf Ali	Bahujan Samaj Party
2017	Naseer Ahmad Khan	Samajwadi Party
2022	Naseer Ahmad Khan	Samajwadi Party

== Election results ==
=== 2027 ===
2027 Uttar Pradesh Legislative Assembly election: Chamraua
Party	Candidate	Votes	%	±%
INDIA				
NDA				
BSP				
NOTA	None of the above			
Majority				
Turnout				
gain from		Swing		

=== 2022 ===
2022 Uttar Pradesh Legislative Assembly election: Chamraua
Party	Candidate	Votes	%	±%
SP	Naseer Ahmad Khan	100,976	50.34	+5.35
BJP	Mohan Kumar Lodhi	66,686	33.24	+7.01
INC	Ali Yusuf Ali	18,213	9.08	
BSP	Abdul Mustafa Hussain	10,366	5.17	−22.12
NOTA	None of the above	981	0.49	−0.07
Majority		34,290	17.1	−0.6
Turnout		200,601	65.13	+0.18
SP hold		Swing		

=== 2017 ===
2017 Uttar Pradesh Legislative Assembly election: Chamraua
Party	Candidate	Votes	%	±%
SP	Naseer Ahmad Khan	87,400	44.99	
BSP	Ali Yusuf Ali	53,024	27.29	
BJP	Mohan Kumar Lodhi	50,954	26.23	
NOTA	None of the above	1,077	0.56	
Majority		34,376	17.7	
Turnout		194,285	64.95	
SP gain from BSP		Swing		

=== 2012 ===
16th Vidhan Sabha: 2012 General Elections

2012 General Elections: Chamraua
Party	Candidate	Votes	%	±%
BSP	Ali Yusuf Ali	37,083	22.42	–
SP	Naseer Ahmad Khan	35,237	21.3	–
INC	Muti Ur Rehman Khan	28,155	17.02	–
	Remainder 16 candidates	64,920	39.25	–
Majority		1,846	1.12	–
Turnout		165,395	61.61	–
BSP hold		Swing		

== See also ==
- Government of Uttar Pradesh
- List of Vidhan Sabha constituencies of Uttar Pradesh
- Rampur district
- Rampur Lok Sabha constituency
- Sixteenth Legislative Assembly of Uttar Pradesh
- Uttar Pradesh
- Uttar Pradesh Legislative Assembly
