= Baldev Singh Aulakh =

Indian politician

Minister of State for Ministry of Agriculture & Ministry of Agricultural Education & Research Government of Uttar Pradesh
- Incumbent
- Assumed office 25 March 2022
- Preceded by: Lakhan Singh

Minister of State for Ministry of Jal Shakti Government of Uttar Pradesh
- In office 2017–2022
- Chief Minister: Yogi Adityanath
- Succeeded by: Dinesh Khatik

Member of the Uttar Pradesh Legislative Assembly
- Incumbent
- Assumed office 11 March 2017
- Preceded by: Sanjay Kapoor
- Constituency: Bilaspur

Personal details
- Born: 10 June 1964 (age 62) Bilaspur, Uttar Pradesh, India
- Party: Bharatiya Janata Party
- Spouse: Rajvinder Kaur Aulakh
- Children: Gurkeerat Singh Aulakh (Son) Student Leader (ABVP)(DELHI UNIVERSITY), Lalit Chokher Sukhman Aulakh (Daughter)
- Education: Kumaun University (M.A.)
- Occupation: Politician
- Profession: Agriculturist

Baldev Singh Aulakh (born 10 June 1964) is an Indian politician from the state of Uttar Pradesh. He currently represents the Bilaspur constituency in the Uttar Pradesh Legislative Assembly as a Leader of the Bharatiya Janata Party.

== Political career ==
Aulakh participated in youth politics while studying in Kumaun University. In 1998, he joined the Bharatiya Janata Party after meeting Mukhtar Abbas Naqvi. He won from the Bilaspur constituency in the 2017 Assembly election by defeating Indian National Congress' Sanjay Kapoor.

== Posts held ==
#	From	To	Position	Comments
01	March 2017	2022	Member of the Uttar Pradesh Legislative Assembly	
02	2017	2022	Minister of State for Ministry of Jal Shakti Government of Uttar Pradesh	
03	March 2022	Incumbent	Member of the Uttar Pradesh Legislative Assembly	
04	2022	Incumbent	Minister of State for Ministry of Agriculture & Ministry of Agricultural Education & Research Government of Uttar Pradesh	
