= Tanda, Rampur =

Tanda
- City
- Location in Uttar Pradesh, India Tanda (India)
- Coordinates: 28.974°N 78.942°E
- Country: India
- State: Uttar Pradesh
- District: Rampur
- Elevation: 78 m (256 ft)

Population (2001)
  - Total: 40,009

Languages
  - Official: Hindi, Urdu
- Time zone: UTC+5:30 (IST)
- Vehicle registration: UP
- Website: up.gov.in

Tanda is a city and a municipal board in Rampur district in the Indian state of Uttar Pradesh.

== Geography ==
Tanda is located at 28.974°N 78.942°E. It has an average elevation of 78 metres (255 feet). Main business of Tanda is rice.

== Demographics ==
As of 2001 India census, Tanda had a population of 40,009. Males constitute 53% of the population and females 47%. Tanda has an average literacy rate of 36%, lower than the national average of 59.5%: male literacy is 44%, and female literacy is 27%. In Tanda, 21% of the population is under 6 years of age.
