= Amin ud-din Ahmad Khan =

Amin ud-din Ahmad Khan (23 March 1911 – 12 June 1983) was the last ruling Nawab of the princely state of Loharu, during the British Raj, reigning from 1926 to 1947.

Born on 23 March 1911 in Delhi, he studied at Aitchison College, Lahore. He was later a member of the Chamber of Princes, and briefly served in the Indian Army and saw action during the Liberation of Goa in 1961.

He was a leader of the regional Indian National Congress party, and became a member of the Legislative Assembly of Rajasthan (MLA), and subsequently the 'Minister Public Works Department', Government of Rajasthan from 1967 to 1976.

He was appointed the 2nd governor of Himachal Pradesh (1977–1981) and 11th governor of Punjab (1981–1982).

He donated the famous and valuable library collection of his family to the Raza Library in Rampur. He died at New Delhi on 12 June 1983, aged 72.

== Personal life ==
He had one daughter from his wife, Shahzadi Sultan Begum,

- Mah Bano Begum (Born 1934): married to H. E. Dr. S. M. Koreshi, Ambassador of Pakistan.

He had one daughter from his wife, Saira Begum,

- Shah Bano Begum (Born 1937)

He had three children from his wife, Shaukat Jehan Begum,

- Ala-uddin Ahmad Khan II (Born 1938): After staying in Kolkata for many years, he now lives in Loharu town
- Durru Miyan (Born 1944): Indian National Congress politician, member Legislative Assembly of Rajasthan state, settled in Jaipur
- Noor Bano (Born 1939): Married to Syed Zulfikar Ali Khan of Rampur (Titular Nawab of Rampur), and a member 11th Lok Sabha and 13th Lok Sabha.

He had one son from his fourth wife, Syeda Jamila Begim,

- Jamiluddin Ahmed Khan (1925–2015): The famous Pakistani poet, critic, playwright, essayist, columnist, and scholar who went by the name of Jamiluddin Aali. He migrated to Karachi, Pakistan in 1947.

== Titles ==
- 1911–1926: Nawabzada Mirza Amin ud-din Ahmed Khan
- 1926–1931: His Excellency Fakhr ud-Daula, Nawab Mirza Amin ud-din Ahmad Khan Bahadur, Nawab of Loharu
- 1931–1934: Second Lieutenant His Excellency Fakhr ud-Daula, Nawab Mirza Amin ud-din Ahmad Khan Bahadur, Nawab of Loharu
- 1934–1939: Lieutenant His Excellency Fakhr ud-Daula, Nawab Mirza Amin ud-din Ahmad Khan Bahadur, Nawab of Loharu
- 1939–1948: Captain His Excellency Fakhr ud-Daula, Nawab Mirza Amin ud-din Ahmad Khan Bahadur, Nawab of Loharu
- 1948–1961: Captain His Highness Fakhr ud-Daula, Nawab Mirza Amin ud-din Ahmad Khan Bahadur, Nawab of Loharu
- 1961–1983: Major His Highness Fakhr ud-Daula, Nawab Mirza Amin ud-din Ahmad Khan Bahadur, Nawab of Loharu

== Honours ==
- King George V Silver Jubilee Medal-1935
- King George VI Coronation Medal-1937
- Indian Independence Medal-1947
