= Sanjay Kapoor (politician) =

Indian politician

Sanjay Kapoor संजय कपूर

MLA in 16th Legislative Assembly of Uttar Pradesh
- In office March 2012 – March 2017
- Preceded by: Self
- Succeeded by: Baldev Singh Aulakh
- Constituency: Bilaspur, Uttar Pradesh

MLA in 15th Legislative Assembly of Uttar Pradesh
- In office March 2007 – March 2012
- Preceded by: Beena Bhardwaj
- Succeeded by: Self
- Constituency: Bilaspur, Uttar Pradesh

Personal details
- Born: 15 July 1962 (age 64) Rampur, Uttar Pradesh, India
- Party: Indian National Congress
- Spouse: Leena Kapoor (wife)
- Children: 2 sons and 1 daughter
- Parent: Bhagwati Prasad (father)
- Education: M. J. P. Rohilkhand University
- Profession: Agriculturist & Politician

Sanjay Kapoor (Hindi: संजय कपूर; born 15 July 1962) is an Indian Congress politician and a member of the 16th Legislative Assembly of Uttar Pradesh of India. He represented the Bilaspur constituency of Uttar Pradesh and is also a National Secretary of the Indian National Congress.

== Early life and education ==
Sanjay Kapoor was born in Rampur district. He attended the M. J. P. Rohilkhand University and attained Bachelor of Commerce & Bachelor of Laws degrees.

== Political career ==
Sanjay Kapoor has been a MLA for two terms. He represented the Bilaspur constituency and is also a National Secretary of the Indian National Congress.

He lost his seat in the 2017 Uttar Pradesh Assembly election to Baldev Singh Aulakh of the Bharatiya Janata Party.

== Posts held ==
#	From	To	Position	Comments
01	March 2007	March 2012	Member, 15th Legislative Assembly	
02	March 2012	March 2017	Member, 16th Legislative Assembly	

== See also ==
- Uttar Pradesh Legislative Assembly
