= Beena Bhardwaj =

Indian politician

Beena Bharadwaj
- बिना भारद्वाज

14th Legislative Assembly of Uttar Pradesh
- In office February 2002 – May 2007
- Leader: Mulayam Singh Yadav

Personal details
- Party: Samajwadi Party (Till 2017), Bhartiya Janta Party Since 2017

Beena Bharadwaj is an Indian politician who is a member of the 14th Legislative Assembly of Uttar Pradesh for the Bilaspur, Uttar Pradesh Assembly constituency with a 2002 win from party Samajwadi Party. She join BJP in 2017 and has been active there in various party roles.
