= Mohibbullah Nadvi =

Indian Islamic scholar and politician (b. 1976)

Member of Parliament, Lok Sabha
- Incumbent
- Assumed office 4 June 2024
- Preceded by: Ghanshyam Singh Lodhi
- Constituency: Rampur

Personal details
- Born: 1 January 1976 (age 50) Razanagar, Rampur district, Uttar Pradesh, India
- Party: Samajwadi Party
- Parent: Mohammad Ali (father)
- Education: Aālimiyyah; Master of Arts; Bachelor of Education
- Alma mater: Darul Uloom Nadwatul Ulama; Jamia Millia Islamia; Al-Falah University
- Occupation: Islamic scholar, Politician

Mohibbullah Nadvi (born 1 January 1976; Hindi pronunciation: [moːɦɪbʊlːaːɦ n̪əd̪ʋiː]) is an Indian Islamic scholar, politician, and current Member of Parliament of Lok Sabha from Rampur constituency. He is the Imam of the Parliament Street Mosque in Delhi and a member of the Samajwadi Party.

== Early life and education ==
Mohibbullah Nadvi was born on January 1, 1976, to Mohammad Ali in Razanagar village, Rampur, Uttar Pradesh, to a Muslim family of Mohammad Ali.

He received his Quranic education, or Hifz, in Rampur before continuing his studies at a madrasa in Sambhal.

Afterward, he moved to Lucknow to pursue higher education in Islamic studies at Darul Uloom Nadwatul Ulama, where he earned his title. He then headed to Aligarh for further studies but, disliking the intense political atmosphere on campus, chose instead to enroll at Jamia Millia Islamia in Delhi, where he graduated with a degree in Arabic honors. He later completed an MA in Islamic Studies and obtained a BEd from Al-Falah University.

== Career ==
On March 28, 2005, Nadvi was appointed as an imam at the Parliament Street Mosque, New Delhi.

He defeated Ghanshyam Singh Lodhi of the Bharatiya Janata Party by 87,434 votes in 2024 Indian general election from the Rampur constituency.

While giving a statement on external affairs in July 2024, he said that India is a great country. India should not only stop the war in Gaza by mediating but should also stop the war in Ukraine by intervening because India is the biggest example of a humanitarian approach, and that there is no bigger example of it than India in the world.

== Controversy ==
In July 2025, Nadvi faced political and religious criticism after photographs appeared showing Samajwadi Party (SP) leaders, including Akhilesh Yadav and MP Dimple Yadav, inside the Parliament Street Mosque in New Delhi, where he serves as imam. According to BJP leaders, the gathering was political and amounted to misuse of the mosque, while SP leaders described it as a social visit.

Shahabuddin Razvi Barelvi, president of the All India Muslim Jamaat, wrote to Delhi chief minister Rekha Gupta demanding Nadvi’s removal, citing what he described as a violation of the mosque’s sanctity, the entry of persons he called “impure”, and the participation of women despite local restrictions. BJP Minority Morcha president Jamal Siddiqui also wrote to the Lok Sabha Speaker seeking Nadvi’s disqualification, alleging that his position as imam constituted an “office of profit” paid by the Delhi Waqf Board, and further alleging that he had hosted tea and snacks for party leaders inside the mosque.

Separately, All India Imam Association president Sajid Rashidi criticised Nadvi for not objecting to Dimple Yadav’s attire and seating posture, remarks that led to an FIR against Rashidi for what police described as inflammatory and misogynistic comments. Nadvi rejected all allegations, stating that the gathering was informal, held ahead of a Parliament session, and intended to brief Akhilesh Yadav and others on the mosque’s history, noting that leaders such as Maulana Azad, Jawaharlal Nehru, Rajendra Prasad, and A. P. J. Abdul Kalam had previously offered prayers there.

During the Winter Session of Parliament in December 2025, Samajwadi Party MP Mohibbullah Nadvi made a contentious remark in the Lok Sabha. Speaking about the Waqf (Amendment) Act and issues affecting the Muslim community, he stated that if what he described as oppression continued, “Muslims might have to do jihad.” His comment sparked strong reactions and a political controversy.

== See also ==
- 2024 Indian general election
