= Ali Yusuf Ali =

Indian politician

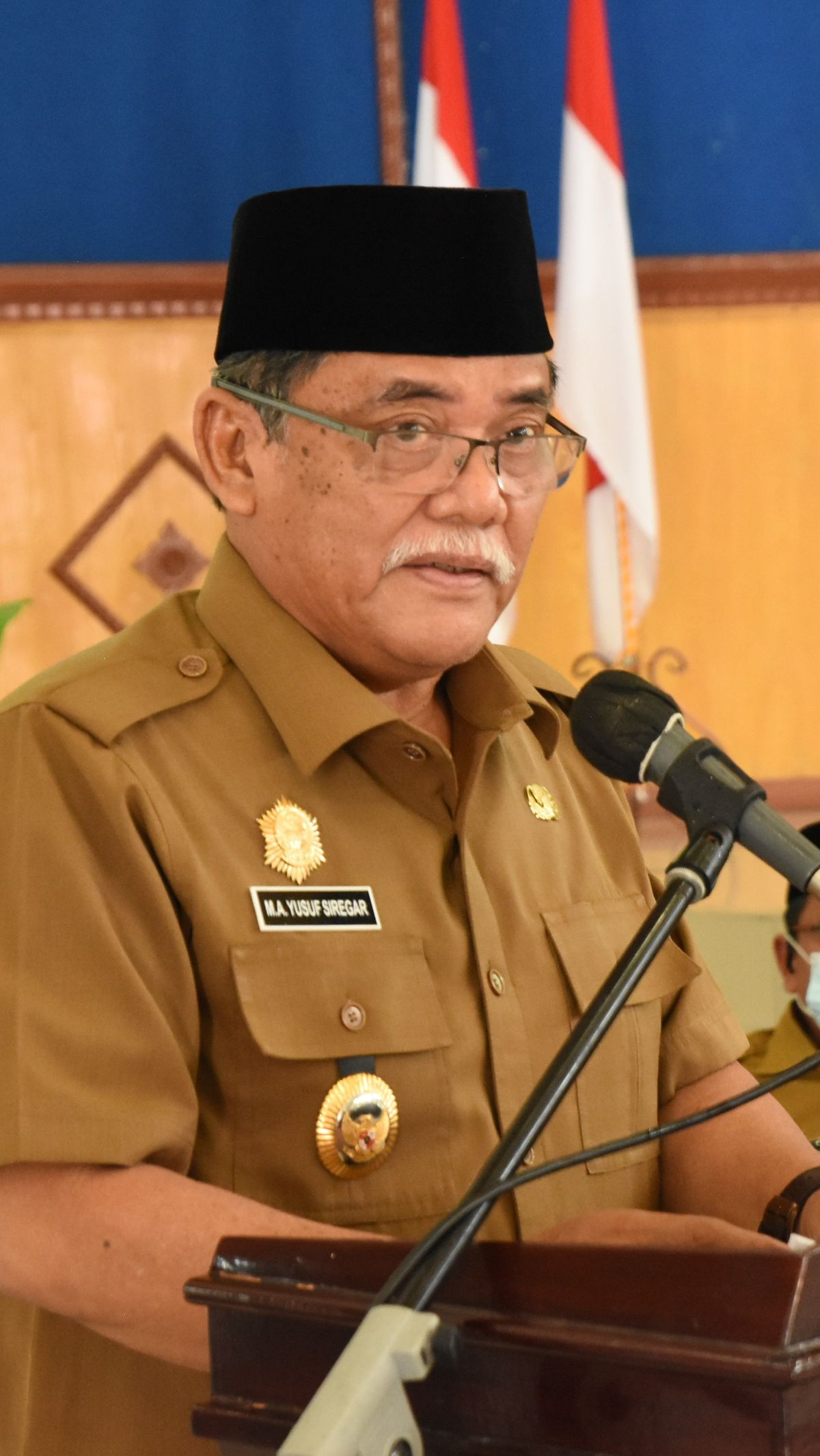

MLA, 16th Legislative Assembly
- In office Mar 2012 – Mar 2017
- Preceded by: None
- Succeeded by: Naseer Ahmad Khan
- Constituency: Chamraua

Personal details
- Born: 1 July 1976 (age 50) Rampur district
- Party: Indian National Congress
- Spouse: Shahin Yusuf (wife)
- Children: 2 sons, Aayan & Alma
- Parent: Nazakat Ali (father)
- Education: Choudary Jamuna Das Inter College
- Profession: Agriculturist & Politician

Ali Yusuf Ali is an Indian politician and a member of the 16th Legislative Assembly of Uttar Pradesh of India. He represents the Chamraua constituency of Uttar Pradesh and is a member of the Bahujan Samaj Party political party.

== Early life and education ==
Ali Yusuf Ali was born in Rampur district. He attended the Choudary Jamuna Das Inter College and attained twelfth grade degree.

== Political career ==
Ali Yusuf Ali has been a MLA for one term. He represented the Chamraua constituency and is a member of the Bahujan Samaj Party political party.

He lost his seat in the 2017 Uttar Pradesh Assembly election to Naseer Ahmed Khan of the Samajwadi Party.

== Posts held ==
#	From	To	Position	Comments
01	2012	Mar-2017	Member, 16th Legislative Assembly	

== See also ==
- Chamraua
- Sixteenth Legislative Assembly of Uttar Pradesh
- Uttar Pradesh Legislative Assembly
