= Azam Khan (politician) =

Indian politician (born 1948)

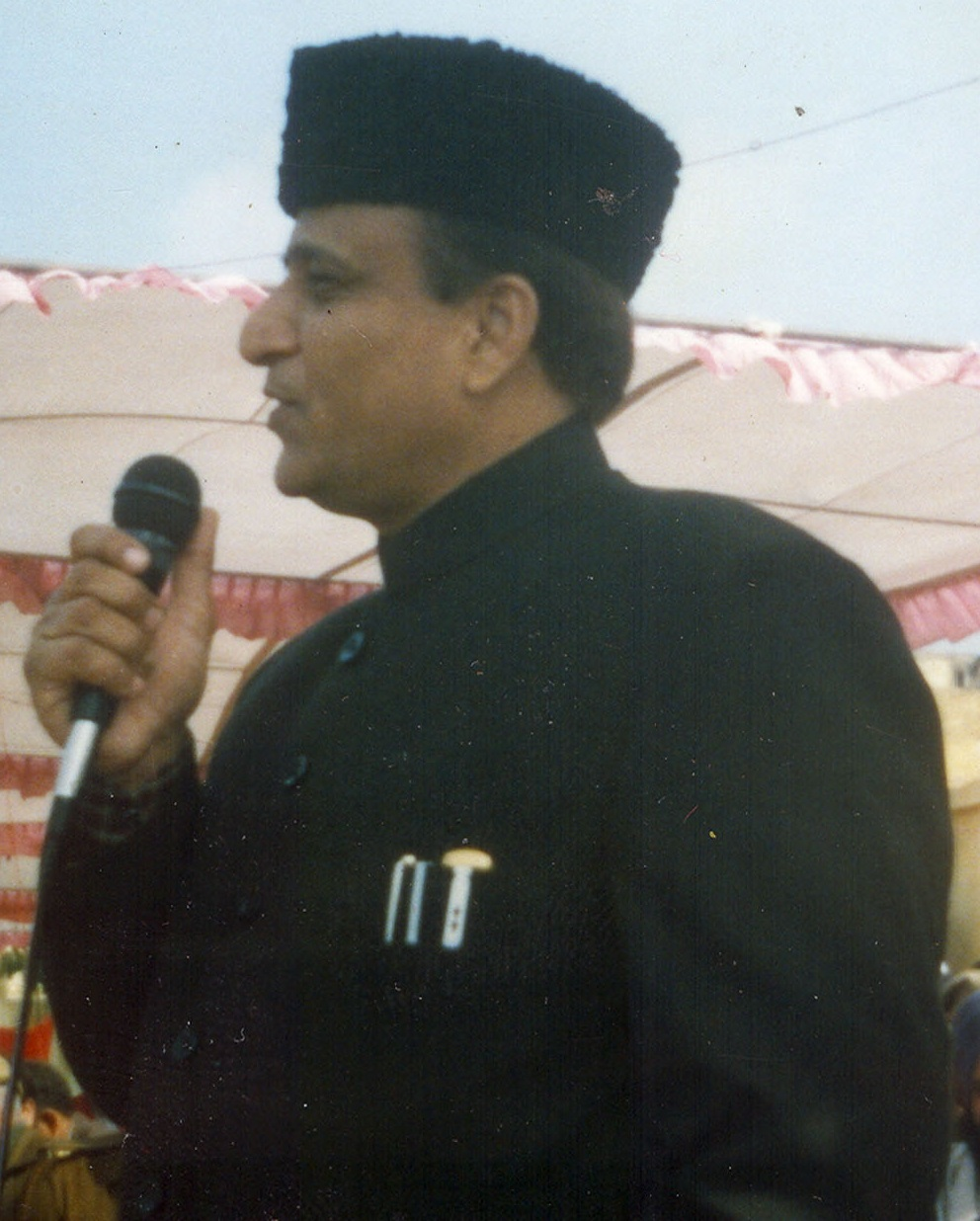

Member of the Uttar Pradesh Legislative Assembly
- In office 10 March 2022 – 27 October 2022
- Preceded by: Tazeen Fatma
- Succeeded by: Akash Saxena
- In office 26 February 2002 – 23 May 2019
- Preceded by: Afroz Ali Khan
- Succeeded by: Tazeen Fatma
- In office 9 June 1980 – 28 October 1995
- Preceded by: Manzoor Ali Khan
- Succeeded by: Afroz Ali Khan
- Constituency: Rampur

Chancellor of the Mohammad Ali Jauhar University
- Incumbent
- Assumed office 2012
- Vice-Chancellor: Dr. Zaheeruddin; Sultan Mohammad Khan
- Preceded by: Office established

Member of Parliament, Lok Sabha
- In office 23 May 2019 – 22 March 2022
- Preceded by: Naipal Singh
- Succeeded by: Ghanshyam Singh Lodhi
- Constituency: Rampur

Cabinet Minister Government of Uttar Pradesh
- In office 15 March 2012 – 19 March 2017
- Governor: Ram Naik; Aziz Qureshi; Banwari Lal Joshi
- Chief Minister: Akhilesh Yadav
- Ministry and Departments: Parliamentary Affairs; Muslim Waqf; Urban Development; Water Supplies; Urban Employment & Poverty Alleviation; Overall Urban Development; Minority Welfare and Haj.
- Succeeded by: Ashutosh Tandon; Nand Gopal Gupta
- In office 29 August 2003 – 13 May 2007
- Governor: Vishnu Kant Shastri; Sudarshan Agarwal; T. V. Rajeswar
- Chief Minister: Mulayam Singh Yadav
- Ministry and Departments: Parliamentary Affairs; Urban Development

Member of Parliament, Rajya Sabha
- In office 1996–2002
- Constituency: Uttar Pradesh

Personal details
- Born: 14 August 1948 (age 78) Rampur, United Provinces, India (now in Uttar Pradesh, India)
- Party: Samajwadi Party
- Other political affiliations: Janata Party; Janata Dal; Lok Dal; Janata Party (Secular)
- Spouse: Tazeen Fatma (wife)
- Children: 2 (including Abdullah Azam Khan)
- Education: Aligarh Muslim University
- Profession: Lawyer, politician

Mohammad Azam Khan (born 14 August 1948) is an Indian politician, lawyer and former elected representative who has served as the Member of Parliament from Rampur. He is one of the founding members of the Samajwadi Party and was a member of the Seventeenth Legislative Assembly of Uttar Pradesh. He was also the senior most Cabinet Minister in the Government of Uttar Pradesh and has been elected member of the legislative assembly ten times from Rampur assembly constituency. He was disqualified from his elected seat when he received a two-year prison sentence from the court.

== Life and education ==
Azam Khan was born in Rampur, Uttar Pradesh, India to Mumtaz Khan. He attended Aligarh Muslim University and attained Bachelor of Laws degree in 1974. Khan married Tazeen Fatma in 1981 and has two sons. Prior to entering politics, he worked as a lawyer. His son Abdullah Azam Khan was an MLA from Suar Assembly Constituency from 2017 to 2019.

== Political career ==
Azam Khan hailed from an ordinary family. He forged unions of bidi and textile workers and rickshaw pullers in order to take on Nawab of Rampur in 1980's. Azam Khan ended the political domination of the Nawab family in Rampur. Since then, Azam Khan has been an MLA for ten terms; all from Rampur assembly constituency. He was also a cabinet minister in the government of Uttar Pradesh. Khan is currently a member of the Samajwadi Party but has been a member of four other political parties between 1980 and 1992. During his first term (8th Legislative Assembly of Uttar Pradesh), he was a member of Janata Party (Secular). During his second term (9th Legislative Assembly of Uttar Pradesh), he was a member of the Lok Dal. Khan was a member of Janata Dal during his third term (10th Legislative Assembly of Uttar Pradesh). In his fourth term (11th Legislative Assembly of Uttar Pradesh), Azam Khan was a member of Samajwadi Janata Party. Since 1993 (his fifth term and 12th Legislative Assembly of Uttar Pradesh), he has been a member of the Samajwadi Party.

Azam Khan also held a post of General Secretary in Samajwadi Party. On 17 May 2009, he resigned from the post of the party. During the 15th Loksabha elections, he became involved in a controversy with Jaya Prada, who was contesting from BJP ticket and the surrounding controversies resulted in party crisis. On 24 May 2009, he claimed to have been expelled for six years although the party chief claimed he himself resigned. The Samajwadi Party later revoked his expulsion and he rejoined on 4 December 2010. After his successful win in 2014, Khan has been given ticket from Rampur constituency by the Samajwadi Party for the Lok Sabha elections of 2019.

During his career as a lawmaker and minister, there were many instances of Khan engaging in profanity. He allegedly made provocative and objectionable comments against bureaucrats, government officials and abused his staff.

During the 2019 Lok Sabha elections, Khan was prohibited from campaigning twice after Election Commission of India found him guilty of making objectionable comments in six of his speeches, including foul comments for his opponent Jaya Prada, and violating the Model Code of Conduct. Khan was accused of making sexist remarks again, while addressing his electorate for the first time after winning the Lok Sabha election, and a case was filed against him. The National Commission for Women (NCW) reacted to the incident by calling for his disqualification.

In 2023, Azam Khan was sentenced to two-years imprisonment by the court for using “criminal force to deter public servant from discharge of his duty” and inciting violence. This incident occurred in 2008 when the police stopped his vehicle for a search after an attack on a CRPF camp in his constituency, Khan allegedly obstructed traffic on the road and caused inconvenience to the public on the highway. After this conviction, he was disqualified as Member of Legislative Assembly in accordance with Representation of the People Act, 1951 which mandates any elected leader who receive a jail sentence of two years or more will be disqualified from holding office. Following their conviction, they will be ineligible to vote for six years, rendering them unable to run for any elections during this time. He lost his seat from Rampur constituency which he held for about three decades.

=== Remarks ===
In November 2014, Khan described the Ram Janmabhoomi issue as "dead issue", arguing that a temple already existed at the site of dispute in Ayodhya. His remarks were criticized by Muslim litigants involved in the Babri Masjid case.

== Legal cases ==
The number of criminal cases against Khan are said to range between 80 to 110, depending on various estimates. The exact number of criminal cases registered against him is not publicly know. Many of them are related to alleged land encroachment and criminal intimidation, most of them registered after 2017 in connection with land-grabbing for Muhammad Ali Jauhar University.

As per various reliable sources, Khan has been convicted in 08 cases so far, while he has been acquitted in 08 cases.

Rampur Police has been investigating one of the cases of land acquisition. There are several cases of land grab registered against the NGO ‘Jauhar Trust’ founded by Khan.

In January 2019, a case of forgery was lodged against Khan, his wife Tazeen Fatma and son with respect to the birth certificate of his son Abdullah at a local police station in Uttar Pradesh. In March 2019, the Allahabad High Court stayed their arrest until the probe was completed by the police. Khan was supported by party leader Akhilesh Yadav who claimed the cases were politically motivated. In January 2020, the court declared the three, Abdullah and his parents, to be absconders for failing to appear in the court during case hearings. Following this, the Enforcement Directorate attached the properties of Khan from the first week of February onward. On 26 February 2020, Khan was sentenced to imprisonment along with his wife and son for forging a fake birth certificate for his son. The Supreme Court granted interim bail on 19 May 2022 in an alleged cheating case. The interim bail will continue till his regular bail plea is decided, clearing the way for his release. On 27 October 2022, an MP-MLA magistrate court sentenced him to a three-year jail term after finding him guilty of hate speech in a 2019 case. On 24 May 2023, a UP court acquitted Khan in a hate speech case.

In October 2024, the Supreme Court of India berated Azam Khan and labelled the lease of government land to his Maulana Mohamad Ali Jauhar Trust in Rampur as a “misuse of office”.

On November 17, 2025, Azam Khan and his son Abdullah Azam were convicted and sentenced to jail terms of up to seven years by a special MP/MLA court in a 2019 case related to obtaining two PAN cards using different dates of birth, a prosecution officer said.

== Personal life ==
Azam Khan was born in Rampur, Uttar Pradesh to Mumtaz Khan. He attended Aligarh Muslim University and attained a Bachelor of Laws degree in 1974. Khan married Tazeen Fatma in 1981. Tazeen Fatma is a former Member of Parliament, Rajya Sabha and former MLA from Rampur. The couple has two sons — Abdullah Azam Khan, former MLA from Swar, and Mohammad Adeeb Azam Khan.

== Positions held ==
#	From	To	Position	Party
01	1980	1985	MLA (1st term) from Rampur	Janata Party (S)
02	1985	1989	MLA (2nd term) from Rampur	Lok Dal
03	1989	1991	MLA (3rd term) from Rampur; Minister in the Government of UP	Janata Dal
04	1991	1992	MLA (4th term) from Rampur	Janata Party
05	1993	1995	MLA (5th term) from Rampur; Minister in the Government of UP	SP
06	1996	2002	MP (1st term) in Rajya Sabha from Uttar Pradesh	SP
07	2002	2007	MLA (6th term) from Rampur; Leader of the opposition in UP Legislative assembly (2002–03); Cabinet Minister in the Government of UP (2003–07)	SP
08	2007	2012	MLA (7th term) from Rampur	SP
09	2012	2017	MLA (8th term) from Rampur; Cabinet Minister in the Government of UP	SP
10	2017	2019	MLA (9th term) from Rampur (resigned in 2019)	SP
11	2019	2022	MP (1st term) in 17th Lok Sabha from Rampur (resigned in 2022)	SP
12	2022	2022	MLA (10th term) from Rampur (Disqualified on 27 October 2022 for The Rampur court had sentenced Mr Khan to three years of imprisonment in the hate speech case of 2019)	SP

== See also ==
- Kamlesh Tiwari
- Mohammad Ali Jauhar University
- Rampur
- Government of Uttar Pradesh
- Sixteenth Legislative Assembly of Uttar Pradesh
- Uttar Pradesh Legislative Assembly

Lok Sabha
Preceded by Naipal Singh	Member of Parliament for Rampur; 2019 – 2022	Succeeded by Ghanshyam Singh Lodhi
