= Bilaspur district =

Bilaspur district may refer to either of these districts of India:

- Bilaspur district, Chhattisgarh
- Bilaspur district, Himachal Pradesh

== See also ==
- Bilaspur (disambiguation)
