= Bilaspur, Uttar Pradesh Assembly constituency =

Constituency of the Uttar Pradesh legislative assembly in India

Bilaspur
- Constituency No. 36 for the Uttar Pradesh Legislative Assembly

Constituency details
- Country: India
- Region: North India
- State: Uttar Pradesh
- District: Rampur
- Total electors: 295,959 (2012)
- Reservation: None

Member of Legislative Assembly
- 18th Uttar Pradesh Legislative Assembly
- Incumbent Baldev Singh Aulakh
- Party: Bharatiya Janata Party
- Elected year: 2022

Bilaspur Assembly constituency is one of the 403 constituencies of the Uttar Pradesh Legislative Assembly, India. It is a part of the Rampur district and one of the five assembly constituencies in the Rampur Lok Sabha constituency. First election in this assembly constituency was held in 1967 after the delimitation order (DPACO - 1964) was passed in 1964. The constituency was assigned identification number 36 after "Delimitation of Parliamentary and Assembly Constituencies Order, 2008" was passed in the year 2008.

== Wards / Areas ==
Extent of Bilaspur Assembly constituency is Bilaspur Tehsil; Sihari, PCs Nagla Udai, Shyampur, Khata Kalan, Dhanaili Uttri, Pashupura of Milak KC of Milak Tehsil.

== Members of the Legislative Assembly ==
Year	Member	Party
1967	Munshi Lal	Swatantra Party
1969	Chanchal Singh	Indian National Congress
1974	Sohan Lal	Bharatiya Kranti Dal
1977	Sohan Lal	Janata Party
1980	Chanchal Singh	Indian National Congress (I)
1985	Daljit Singh	Indian National Congress
1989	Anil Kumar	Independent
1991	Jwala Prasad	Bharatiya Janata Party
1993	Harendra Singh	Samajwadi Party
1996	Muhammad Kazim Ali Khan	Indian National Congress
2002	Beena Bhardwaj	Samajwadi Party
2007	Sanjay Kapoor	Indian National Congress
2012	Sanjay Kapoor	Indian National Congress
2017	Baldev Singh Aulakh	Bharatiya Janata Party
2022	Baldev Singh Aulakh	Bharatiya Janata Party

== Election results ==
=== 2027 ===
2027 Uttar Pradesh Legislative Assembly election: Bilaspur
Party	Candidate	Votes	%	±%
INDIA				
NDA				
BSP				
NOTA	None of the above			
Majority				
Turnout				
gain from		Swing		

=== 2022 ===
2022 Uttar Pradesh Legislative Assembly election: Bilaspur (Rampur)
Party	Candidate	Votes	%	±%
BJP	Baldev Singh Aulakh	101,998	43.17	▼1.13
SP	Amarjeet Singh	101,691	43.04	
BSP	Ram Autar Kashyap	18,870	7.99	▼9.6
INC	Sanjay Kapoor	9,814	4.15	▼30.16
NOTA	None of the above	1,197	0.51	▼0.04
Majority		307	0.13	▼9.86
Turnout		236,259	68.44	▲0.99
BJP hold		Swing		

=== 2017 ===
2017 Uttar Pradesh Legislative Assembly election: Bilaspur
Party	Candidate	Votes	%	±%
BJP	Baldev Singh Aulakh	99,100	44.3	
INC	Sanjay Kapoor	76,741	34.31	
BSP	Pradeep Kumar	39,344	17.59	
PECP	Shahid Hussain Khan	2,688	1.2	
RLD	Santosh Sharma	2,439	1.09	
NOTA	None of the above	1,227	0.55	
Majority		22,359	9.99	
Turnout		223,694	67.45	
BJP gain from INC		Swing		

=== 2012 ===
17 th Vidhan Sabha: 2012 General Elections

2012 General Elections: Bilaspur
Party	Candidate	Votes	%	±%
INC	Sanjay Kapoor	52,818	27.20	−
SP	Beena Bhardwaj	42,641	21.96	−
BSP	Amrish Kumar	36,224	18.66	−
	Remainder 12 candidates	62,492	32.17	−
Majority		10,177	5.24	−
Turnout		194,175	65.61	−
INC hold		Swing		

== See also ==
- Government of Uttar Pradesh
- List of Vidhan Sabha constituencies of Uttar Pradesh
- Rampur district
- Rampur Lok Sabha constituency
- Sixteenth Legislative Assembly of Uttar Pradesh
- Uttar Pradesh
- Uttar Pradesh Legislative Assembly
