= Galgotias University =

Private university in Uttar Pradesh, India

- Type: Private university
- Established: 2011; 15 years ago
- Founder: Suneel Galgotia
- Chancellor: Suneel Galgotia
- Vice-Chancellor: Dr. K. Mallikharjuna Babu
- Location: Dankaur, Uttar Pradesh, India
- Website: galgotiacollege.edu

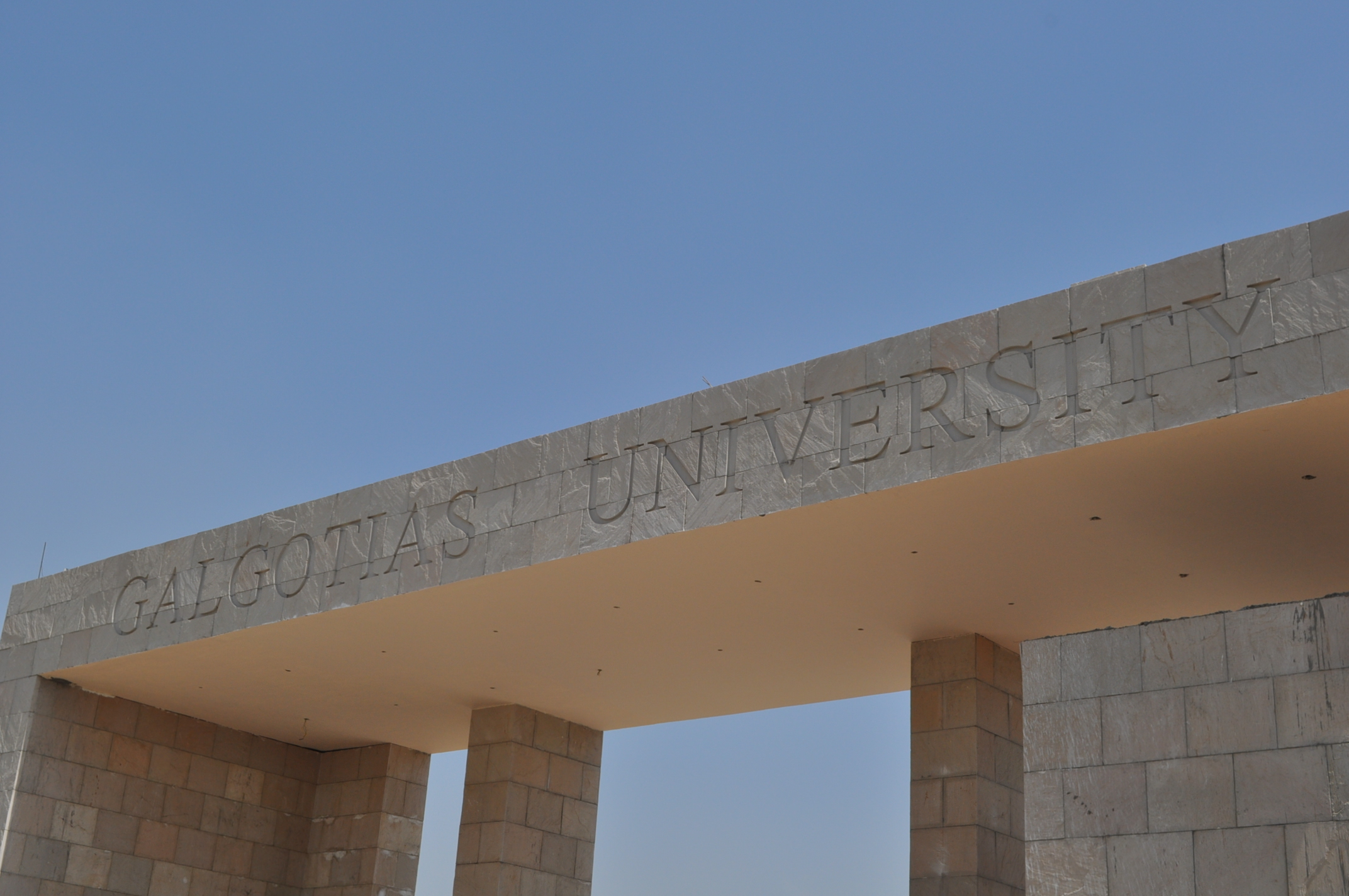
The main gate of Galgotias University

Galgotias University (GU) is a private university on Yamuna Expressway in Dankaur, Uttar Pradesh, India. It was established in 2011 by Suneel Galgotia, who has since served as its chancellor.

== History ==
=== Land acquisition dispute ===
Between 2008–9, lands were acquired from farmers by the Yamuna Expressway Industrial Development Authority (YEIDA) at lower than market rates through invocation of an urgency clause under the Land Acquisition Act 1894. Later, these acquired lands were allotted to educational institutes, including to the Galgotias. Following the 2011 Gajraj case in Allahabad High Court which ruled that urgency clause was wrongly applied in the Greater Noida region and farmers were entitled to 64.7% extra compensation from land allottees. This benefit was extended to farmers who sold their lands to YEIDA, making them entitled to compensation from educational institutes that were allotted the land. This made Galgotias liable to pay an additional 12 crores to farmers, this demand was challenged by Galgotias under the Shakuntala Educational and Welfare Society in the court, where it remains pending to this day.

=== Dubious research ===
In 2020, the university faced criticism for publishing a research paper entitled Coronavirus killed by Sound Vibrations Produced by Thali or Ghanti: A Potential Hypothesis, claiming that sounds vibrations from Narendra Modi's thali (metal plate) banging campaign could kill the COVID-19 virus. The research paper was later retracted.

=== AI Summit false credit controversy ===
In February 2026, the university was participating in the AI Impact Summit in New Delhi. During media interaction with DD News, a member of the university demonstrated a Unitree Go2 robot and claimed that the robot was "developed at the centre of excellence at the Galgotias University". The claim was widely scrutinised and debunked. The same member of the university had also demonstrated a soccer drone, saying it was built and developed at the university; this was debunked later as well.

Subsequently, the 'false claim' by the university was trending on social media across the globe. On the following day, the Government of India expelled the university from the AI Summit. The university was first asked to leave, and then forced after the lights to their pavilion were cut off.

This led to the Galgotias University receiving global attention and condemnation. Later, the university issued a press release apologising for the fiasco.

=== Noida International Airport inauguration ===
Galgotias University came into another controversy when a screenshot of a WhatsApp group chat involving Neha Singh, the head of the Communication Department at Galgotias University, went viral. In the WhatsApp chat, she was seen canvassing students to attend Narendra Modi's inauguration of the Noida International Airport. According to one student, over 300 buses from the University were sent to the event, while another student stated, "A faculty member circulated the communication and required student participation. Students who had no scheduled classes were also told to attend, and we were additionally granted two days of attendance".

== Academics ==
University rankings

Engineering – India
- India Today (2024): 56

Law – India
- India Today (2024): 25

Business/Management – India
- NIRF (2024): 98

Pharmacy – India
- NIRF (2024): 50

In 2025, the Galgotias University launched a four-year Bachelor of Arts (Honours) programme in Digital Media and Communication, in partnership with the India Today Group. (Note: The university has served as a partner for the India Today Conclave's branding and promotion since 2012.)

== Galgotias syndrome ==
Sanjay K. Jha of The Wire (India) coined the term "Galgotias syndrome" to describe the 2026 AI India summit fallout as emblematic of a broader pattern in some Indian institutions and showcases: exaggerated or fraudulent claims of innovation, prioritisation of optics and political alignment over substantive research, and rebranding imported technology as homegrown under pressure to demonstrate "indigenous excellence".

In 2024, the university attracted coverage when its students were protesting against the Indian National Congress's manifesto; however, interviews with the students showed that they had no knowledge about what they were protesting against. Some students could not even read Hindi or English from the placards they were holding, with one of them mispronouncing "urban Naxalism" as "urban Maxwell". In May 2025, Piyush Goyal, the union minister of commerce and industry, served as the chief guest at the university's 11th convocation ceremony, alongside other notable guests, such as Brajesh Pathak, the deputy chief minister of Uttar Pradesh; Mahesh Sharma, an MP representing the Gautam Buddha Nagar Lok Sabha constituency; Dhirendra Singh, an MLA representing the Jewar Assembly constituency within the Gautam Buddha Nagar district; Vinay Kumar Pathak, then the president of the Association of Indian Universities; and Indian entrepreneur and investor Aman Gupta. During the ceremony, a virtual address was given by Deepak Chopra, an American author, New Age guru, and alternative medicine advocate named in the Epstein files.

Sandeep Pandey from the Counterview explained the Galgotia fiasco as symptomatic of deep seated underlying issues plaguing the education sector in India. From widespread practices such as institutionalised cheating, normalised plagiarism, rote memorisation, complacent learning and obsession with clearing exams underscoring the lack of critical thinking and originality to privatisation of education leading to creation of many fraudulent and substandard institutions chasing profit through illicit means such as corruption. He concluded that this system may continue to reproduce itself because of entrenched interests rather than reform for the better.

=== Political alignment with the Sangh Parivar ===
The university is known for its closeness and engagement with the Sangh Parivar.

In 2014, Narendra Modi, then the chief minister of Gujarat, presented the university with the DQ-ICT Award, for being a "top private university in academics and global linkages". Suneel Galgotia and his son Dhruv Galgotia, the university's CEO, were among the select dignitaries invited to Modi's swearing-in ceremony as prime minister.

Over the years, many Bharatiya Janata Party (BJP) politicians, including Sambit Patra and Yogi Adityanath, have attended events organised by the university. In December 2025, Adityanath called the university "a model for other institutions in the state's education sector". Suneel Galgotia, the founder of the university has publicly acknowledged university's commitment to the vision of BJP's leadership, stating, "We remain committed to realising Prime Minister Narendra Modi's vision of making India a developed nation and a global leader and Vishwa Guru, and to Uttar Pradesh Chief Minister Yogi Adityanath's dream of establishing UP as a global knowledge superpower". The university has announced the establishment of several educational centres politically aligned with the BJP, including the Galgotias Vivekananda Research Centre, the Atal Bihari Centre for Arts and Culture, and the Deendayal Upadhyaya Higher Quality Center for disadvantaged groups.

In November 2024, the university participated in VIVIBHA 2024, an event organised by the Bharatiya Shikshan Mandal, a body affiliated with the Hindutva paramilitary organisation Rashtriya Swayamsevak Sangh (RSS); the event was chaired by Mohan Bhagwat, the supreme leader of the RSS. Over the years, several notable RSS leaders have appeared on university campus.

== See also ==
- Abdullah Azam Khan
