= University Grants Commission Consortium for Academic and Research Ethics =

Defunct bibliographic database

The University Grants Commission Consortium for Academic and Research Ethics (UGC-CARE) was created by the University Grants Commission (UGC) to maintain a database of quality academic journals.

In a letter dated 11 February 2025, the UGC announced that it would stop maintaining the UGC-CARE journal list.

== History ==
The UGC-CARE was first mooted in 2018 and the journal list was introduced on 14 June 2019 as a replacement for the earlier UGC Approved List of Journals, which had faced criticism for including predatory and low-quality journals. The new list was developed in collaboration with Savitribai Phule Pune University (SPPU), which conducted a study and discovered that more than 88% of the journals in the previous UGC-approved list were predatory.

The UGC-CARE List is divided into two groups:

- UGC-CARE List – Group I: Journals found qualified through UGC’s prescribed methodology. These journals are regularly reviewed by experts.
- UGC-CARE List – Group II: Journals indexed in globally recognized databases such as Scopus and Web of Science. These journals are automatically included in the UGC-CARE List.

=== Indexing of journals ===
Journals included in the UGC-CARE List were required to meet specific quality criteria, including peer review, ethical publishing standards, and transparency. Researchers and institutions can recommend journals for inclusion through the UGC-CARE website, and each submission were subjected to rigorous evaluation process.

When UGC-CARE was introduced, only research papers in approved/listed journals counted for faculty promotions and appointments.

== Reasons for closure ==
=== Infiltration of substandard journals ===
A major issue was the frequent changes in the UGC-CARE list, with journals being added and removed regularly, making its reliability uncertain. Many researchers published in UGC-CARE Group I journals, only to later discover that their journal had been removed, making their publications ineligible for academic evaluation. This highlighted the presence of low-quality or predatory journals within the UGC-CARE system.

=== Rise of cloned journals ===
The print journals listed in the UGC-CARE were widely cloned digitally by various dubious entities. These digital clones are widespread, and many researchers unknowingly submit their work to them, often to meet PhD requirements or secure promotions. Despite UGC’s efforts to regulate them, faculty members continue to publish in clone journals without verifying their authenticity. Some knowingly submit papers, especially in language-specific journals, where foreign language journals are often cloned in multiple languages.

== See also ==
- India Research Watch
