= Shafeek Ahmed Ansari =

Indian politician

Member of the Uttar Pradesh Legislative Assembly
- Incumbent
- Assumed office 13 May 2023
- Preceded by: Abdullah Azam Khan
- Constituency: Suar

Personal details
- Party: Apna Dal (Sonelal)
- Other political affiliations: National Democratic Alliance (2024–present)
- Spouse: Reshma Perveen Ansari

Shafeek Ahmed Ansari (born 1976) is an Indian politician who has been serving as a Member of the Uttar Pradesh Legislative Assembly from the Suar Assembly constituency since 13 May 2023 being a Member of the Apna Dal (Sonelal). He won in a By-poll after Abdullah Azam Khan was disqualified. He became the first Muslim Member of Legislative Assembly in National Democratic Alliance, Uttar Pradesh.

His wife Reshma Perveen Ansari is the Chairman of the Suar Nagar Palika.
