= Muhammad Kazim Ali Khan =

Indian politician

Kazim Ali Khan

MLA, 16th Legislative Assembly
- In office Mar 2012 – Mar 2017
- Preceded by: himself
- Succeeded by: Abdullah Azam Khan
- Constituency: Suar

MLA, 15th Legislative Assembly
- In office May 2007 – Mar 2012
- Preceded by: himself
- Succeeded by: himself
- Constituency: Suar

MLA, 14th Legislative Assembly
- In office Feb 2002 – May 2007
- Preceded by: Shiv Bahadur Saxena
- Succeeded by: himself
- Constituency: Suar

MLA, 13th Legislative Assembly
- In office Oct 1996 – Mar 2002
- Preceded by: Harendra Singh
- Succeeded by: Beena Bhardwaj
- Constituency: Bilaspur

Personal details
- Born: 16 October 1960 (age 65) Rampur, Uttar Pradesh, India
- Party: Indian National Congress
- Spouse: Yaseen Sultan Jahan
- Children: 2
- Parent(s): Zulfikar Ali Khan (father); Noor Bano
- Education: Columbia University
- Profession: Agriculturist, businessperson, Architect & Politician
- Honours: Order of the Griffon (Mecklenburg); Royal Order of Kamehameha I Order of Saint James of the Sword

Muhammad Kazim Ali Khan is an Indian politician and former member of the Uttar Pradesh Legislative Assembly of India. Khan represented the Bilaspur Assembly constituency and the Suar Assembly constituency over 4 terms. In 2003 he was briefly the state minister for Minority Welfare and Hajj Affairs. Since 2003, he has been the Chairman of the Uttar Pradesh Tourism Development Corporation.

== Personal life ==
Khan was born into the Royal House of Rampur in Rampur district, Uttar Pradesh, India. Khan attended the Chandigarh College of Architecture and attained Bachelor of Architecture degree. Then he matriculated to Columbia University and attained a Master of Architecture & Design management degree. Khan has also been accorded with Order of the Griffon (Mecklenburg) honor.

On 24 December 1986 at Bangalore, Khan married Yaseen Sultan Jahan (born 26 March 1968), the younger daughter of Abdul Rashid Khan of the erstwhile Savanur State. The couple has two sons: Mohammad Khan Wali Ahad Bahadur (born 16 February 1988). On 8 December 2017, at New Delhi, he married Aayat Zamani Begum (born at Allahabad, UP, 28 June 1990), née Shazli Noor Zafar, Ernst & Young Consultant, youngest daughter of Iqbal Zafar, of Kanpur, UP, by his wife, Farah Begum.

- Haider Ali Khan (born 18 March 1990).

== Political career ==
Khan was a MLA for four straight terms. During his first term, he represented the Bilaspur assembly constituency. He then represented the Suar constituency for three terms. He has twice been Minister in Samajwadi as well as Bahujan Samaj Party governments. On 14 June 2016 he was expelled from Indian National Congress for cross voting in Rajya Sabha Elections.

== Posts held ==
#	From	To	Position	Comments
01	1996	2002	Member, 13th Legislative Assembly	
02	2002	2007	Member, 14th Legislative Assembly	
03	2007	2012	Member, 15th Legislative Assembly	In May 2007 he resigned but was re-elected in the by-election
04	2012	2017	Member, 16th Legislative Assembly	

== Awards and honours ==
- Order of the Griffon
- Knight Grand Cross of the Royal Order of Kamehameha I
- Knight Grand Cross of the Order of Saint James of the Sword (Kongo)

== Titles ==
- 1960-1971: Nawabzada Sayyid Muhammad Kazim Ali Khan, Wali Ahad Bahadur

== See also ==
- Sixteenth Legislative Assembly of Uttar Pradesh
- Uttar Pradesh Legislative Assembly
