= Bilaspur, Ganjam =

Bilaspur
- Village
- Location in Orissa, India
- Coordinates: 19.522851°N 84.944243°E
- Country: India
- State: Odisha
- District: Ganjam
- Elevation: 54 m (177 ft)

Population (2001)
  - Total: 300

Languages
  - Official: Oriya
- Time zone: UTC+5:30 (IST)
- PIN: 761019
- Telephone code: 06811

Bilaspur is a small village located in the Khalikote block of Ganjam District, Odisha India. It comes under Khalikote legislative assembly and Aska Lok Sabha seat. It was started as a Brahmana Sashana (a village inhibited by Brahmins) on land donated by the then King of Khalikote.

Bilaspur village

There are around 60 houses in the village, and the population is around 300. The primary occupation of the populace is predominantly agriculture, in addition to many of the villagers practice priesthood and karma kanda (Hindu rituals). The Kharakhari River flows to the north of the village, and provides irrigation for the village. It's not a perennial river.

== Places of worship ==
There are four temples in the village, named as "Loknath Temple", "Laxmi Narayan temple", kanoka durga and "Thakurani Temple".

== Education ==
There is a primary school that teaches from class-I and class-V. Kids to Pratapur or Bedha Nilanakhyapur for further education.in pratapur there is a high school tumbanath bidya pitha is an educational environment and the teachers educate their students well in this school for classes 6th to 10th.

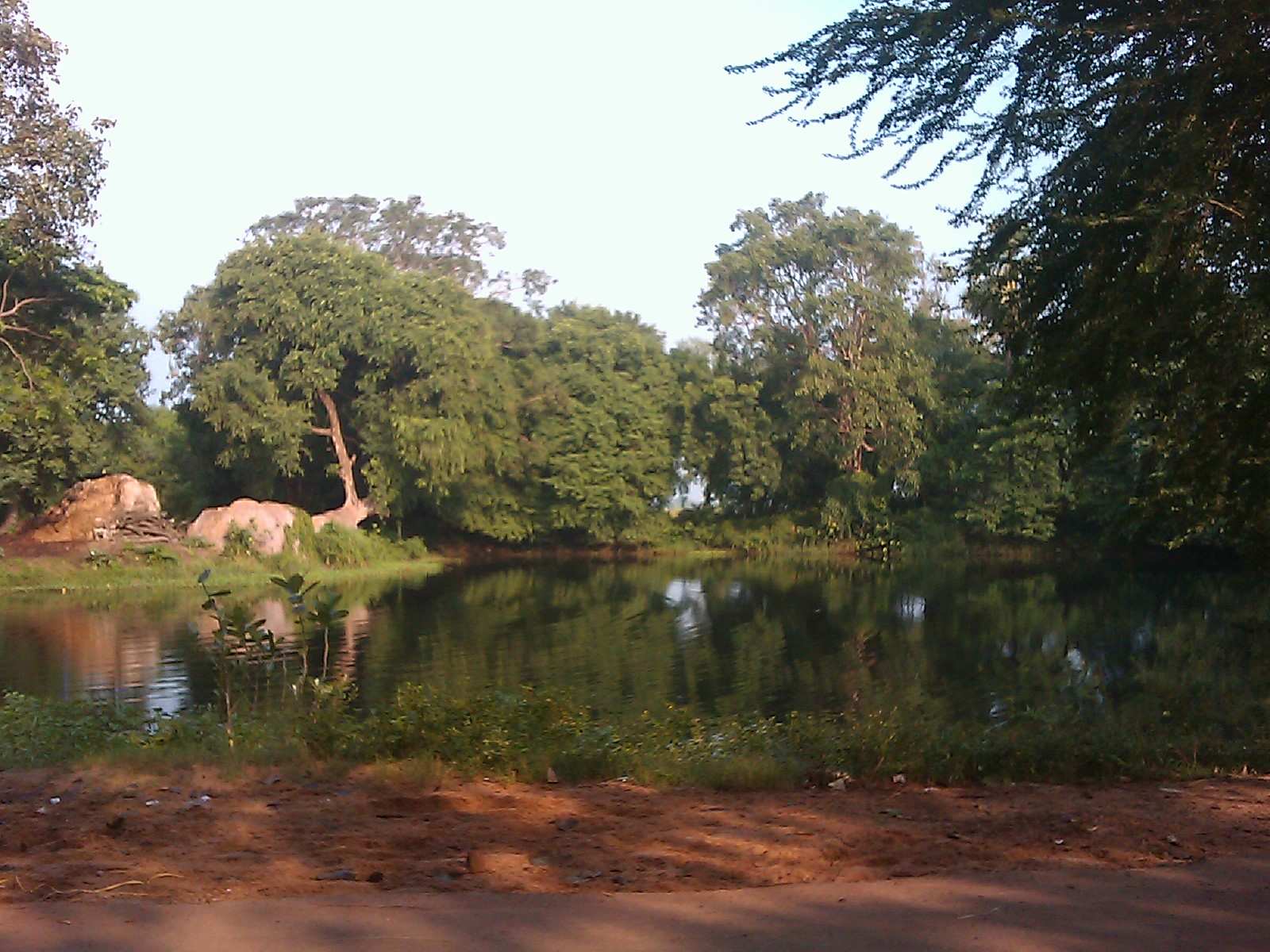
The village pond
