= Naseer Ahmad Khan =

Member of the Uttar Pradesh Legislative Assembly

Member of the Uttar Pradesh Legislative Assembly
- Incumbent
- Assumed office March 2022
- Constituency: Chamraua

Personal details
- Born: 8 July 1938 (age 88) Rampur, Uttar Pradesh, India
- Party: Samajwadi Party
- Parent: Mohammad Shah Khan (father)
- Education: Mahatma Jyotiba Phule Rohilkhand University
- Occupation: Farmer
- Profession: Politician

Naseer Ahmad Khan is an Indian politician and social worker. He is a member of the 18th Legislative Assembly of Uttar Pradesh, representing the Chamraua Assembly constituency of Uttar Pradesh. He is a member of the Samajwadi Party, a socialist political party in India.

== Early life ==
Naseer Ahmad Khan was born on 8 July 1938 in Rampur, Uttar Pradesh, India. His father, Mohammad Shah Khan, was a farmer. He grew up in Uttar Pradesh and post-graduated with a Master of Arts from Mahatma Jyotiba Phule Rohilkhand University, Bareilly, Uttar Pradesh, India.

== Political career ==
In the 2022 Uttar Pradesh Legislative Assembly election, Khan represented Samajwadi Party as a candidate from the Chamraua Assembly constituency and defeated Mohan Kumar Lodhi of the Bharatiya Janata Party by a margin of 34290 votes.

== Posts held ==
#	From	To	Position	Comments
01	2022	Incumbent	Member, 18th Legislative Assembly	
