= Noor Bano (politician) =

Indian politician

Begum Noor Bano

Member of 11th Lok Sabha and 13th Lok Sabha
- Constituency: Rampur

Personal details
- Born: 11 November 1939 (age 86) Bhiwani, Punjab, British India
- Party: Indian National Congress
- Spouse: Syed Zulfiqar Ali Khan

Begum Noor Bano served as a Member of Parliament in the 11th Lok Sabha and 13th Lok Sabha, lower house of parliament of India. She was elected from Rampur on the ticket of Indian National Congress party.

== Early life and education ==
Begum Noor Bano Mehtab Zamani Begum alias was born to Nawab Amin ud-din Ahmad Khan, the last ruling Nawab of Loharu, a princely state, now in Bhiwani district and Shaukat Jehan Begum on 11 November 1939. She obtained her preliminary education from M.G.D Girls' Public School in Jaipur.

== Political career ==
1. Noor Bano joined the All India Congress Committee in the year 1992 and was elected to the Lok Sabha in the year 1996, with 36.96% of votes. She was the runner-up in the next election, losing to Mukhtar Abbas Naqvi.
2. In the year 1996–97, she served as a member in the Committee of the papers laid on the table.
3. She was a member of the Consultative Committee, Ministry of Home Affairs in the years 1996 -99
4. She was reelected to the 13th Lok Sabha in the year 1999 for her second term, with 41.77% of votes.
5. She was a part of the Committee on Commerce in the session 1999–2000.
6. She was a member of the Consultative Committee, Ministry of Chemistry and Fertilizers.

== Special interests and hobbies ==
Noor Bano is a supporter of music and dance. She serves as a patron for the Naina Devi Foundation and the Rampur Gharana, which focuses on music.

Bano is interested in research on Historical and Cultural Persian and Arabic books and Environment and Forest Protection. She enjoys reading, painting, gardening and music. She is a member of several sports clubs across the nation.

== Personal life ==
Begum Noor Banu married Syed Zulfiqar Ali Khan of Rampur on 2 June 1956, and they have three children.

1. Nawabzada Sayyid Muhammad Kazim 'Ali Khan Bahadur (16 October 1960-), who succeeded as Nawab of Rampur. Succeeded on the death of his father as head of the Royal House of Rampur, 5 April 1992. MLA for Swar Tanda Uttar Pradesh state assembly since 2002, Minister for Minority Welfare & Haj Affairs 2003, and Minister of State for Tourism since 2006. Chair Uttar Pradesh Tourism Development Corp since 2003, and Uttar Pradesh Minorities Financial & Development Corp. Convenor The Indian National Trust For Art and Cultural Heritage (INTACH) - Rohilkhand Chapter. Mbr Raza Library Brd 1993–2002. m. at Bangalore, 28 December 1987, H.H. Nawab Firda uz-Zamani Yaseen Sultan Jahan Begum Sahiba (b. at Hyderabad, 27 March 1968), younger daughter of Meherban Nawab 'Abdu’l Rashid Khan Sahib Bahadur, Diler Jang, Nawab of Savanur, by his wife, Nawab Safinaz Jahan Begum Sahiba. He has two sons:

a) Nawabzada Syed 'Ali Muhammad Khan Bahadur (16 February 1989-)

b) Nawabzada Syed Haider 'Ali Khan Bahadur (19 March 1990-)

2. Kaniz-i-Rabab Nawabzadi Saman Begum Sahiba (17 November 1957-) (d/o Noor Bano Begum) married to Sahibzada Irfan 'Ali Khan, son of Nawabzada Yunus 'Ali Khan, of Najibabad. She has two sons:

a) Sahibzada Abbas Asadu'llah Khan (27 July 1982-)

b) Sahibzada Ahmad 'Abdu'llah Khan (26 May 1993-)

3. Kaniz-i-Shaharbanu Nawabzadi Saba Begum Sahiba (2 February 1959-) (d/o Noor Bano Begum) married to Badar Durrez Ahmed [The Hon. Mr Justice Ahmed] (born at Shillong, 16 March 1956). Lecturer in Economics St Stephen's Coll, Delhi Univ 1977–1979, enrolled as an Advocate 1980, served in chambers of Siddhartha Shanker Ray 1980–1983, practised independently 1983–1986, partner "Lawyers Associated" 1986–2000, Judge of the Delhi High Court since 2002, Sec. Ghalib Institute, son of H.E. Dr Fakhruddin 'Ali Ahmed, President of India (24 August 1974 – 11 February 1977) by his wife, Abida Begum, of Haldoi. She has one daughter and one son:

a) Sahibzada Zulnoor Ali Ahmed (15 November 1986-)

b) Sahibzadi Mahira Ali Ahmed (Mahira Ali Soomar) (25 August 1981-) married to Murtaza Ali Soomar. She has one son- Aariz Ali Soomar (11 November 2011-)
