= Swar Assembly constituency =

Constituency of the Uttar Pradesh legislative assembly in India

Swar
- Constituency No. 34 for the Uttar Pradesh Legislative Assembly

Constituency details
- Country: India
- Region: North India
- State: Uttar Pradesh
- District: Rampur
- Lok Sabha constituency: Rampur
- Total electors: 268,889 (2012)
- Reservation: None

Member of Legislative Assembly
- 18th Uttar Pradesh Legislative Assembly
- Incumbent Shafeek Ahmed Ansari
- Party: AD(S)
- Alliance: NDA
- Elected year: 2023

Swar Assembly constituency is one of the 403 constituencies of the Uttar Pradesh Legislative Assembly, India. It is a part of the Rampur district and one of the five assembly constituencies in the Rampur Lok Sabha constituency. First election in this assembly constituency was held in 1957 after the delimitation order (DPACO - 1956) was passed in 1956. The constituency was assigned identification number 34 after "Delimitation of Parliamentary and Assembly Constituencies Order, 2008" was passed in the year 2008. Prior to 2008, this constituency was called Suar Tanda.

== Wards / Areas ==
Extent of Swar Assembly constituency is KCs Tanda, Swar, Forest Rudarapur Range, Swar MB, Tanda MB & Maswasi NP of Swar Tehsil.

== Members of the Legislative Assembly ==
Year	Member	Party
1957	Mahmood Ali Khan	Indian National Congress
1962	Mahmood Ali Khan	Indian National Congress
1967	Mahmood Ali Khan	Swatantra Party
1969	Sakib Petal	Bharatiya Jana Sangh
1974	Mahmood Ali Khan	Indian National Congress
1977	Mahmood Ali Khan	Indian National Congress
1980	Sakib Petal	Bharatiya Janata Party
1985	Mahmood Ali Khan	Indian National Congress
1989	Sakib Petal	Bharatiya Janata Party
1991	Sakib Petal	Bharatiya Janata Party
1993	Sakib Petal	Bharatiya Janata Party
1996	Sakib Petal	Bharatiya Janata Party
2002	Mahmood Ali Khan	Indian National Congress
2007	Mahmood Ali Khan	Samajwadi Party
2007^	Mahmood Ali Khan	Bahujan Samaj Party
2012	Mahmood Ali Khan	Indian National Congress
2017	Mahmood Ali Khan	Samajwadi Party
2022	Mahmood Ali Khan	Samajwadi Party
2023^	Shafeek Ahmed Ansari	Apna Dal (Soneylal)

== Election results ==
=== 2027 ===
2027 Uttar Pradesh Legislative Assembly election: Swar
Party	Candidate	Votes	%	±%
INDIA				
NDA				
BSP				
NOTA	None of the above			
Majority				
Turnout				
gain from		Swing		

2023 Uttar Pradesh Legislative Assembly by-election: Swar
Party	Candidate	Votes	%	±%
AD(S)	Shafeek Ahmed Ansari	68,630	50.81	+20.29
SP	Anuradha Chauhan	59,906	44.35	−14.84
PECP	Dr. Nazia Siddiqui	4,688	3.47	New
NOTA	None of the above	579	0.43	−0.05
Majority		8,724	6.46	−22.21
Turnout		1,35,075		
AD(S) gain from SP		Swing		

=== 2022 ===
2022 Uttar Pradesh Legislative Assembly election: Swar
Party	Candidate	Votes	%	±%
SP	Abdullah Azam Khan	126,162	59.19	+7.29
AD(S)	Nawab Haider Ali Khan	65,059	30.52	New
BSP	Adhyapak Shanker Lal	15,035	7.05	−13.54
INC	Ram Raksha Pal Singh	1,139	0.53	New
AAP	Asif Miya	780	0.37	New
NOTA	None of the Above	1,031	0.48	−0.15
Majority		61,103	28.67	+2.78
Turnout		2,13,160		
SP hold		Swing		

=== 2017 ===
2017 Uttar Pradesh Legislative Assembly election: Swar
Party	Candidate	Votes	%	±%
SP	Abdullah Azam Khan	106,443	51.90	+22.92
BJP	Laxmi Saini	53,347	26.01	+0.97
BSP	Nawab Kazim Ali Khan	42,233	20.59	New
NOTA	None of the Above	1,283	0.63	N/A
Majority		53,096	25.89	+17.67
Turnout		2,05,962	69.59%	+7.57
SP gain from INC		Swing		

=== 2012 ===
2012 Uttar Pradesh Legislative Assembly election: Swar
Party	Candidate	Votes	%	±%
INC	Nawab Kazim Ali Khan	55,469	33.26	−
BJP	Laxmi Saini	41,754	25.04	−
SP	Abdul Ghafoor	37,828	22.68	−
	Remainder 12 candidates	31,725	19.03	−
Majority		13,715	8.22	−
Turnout		1,66,776	62.02	−
INC hold		Swing		

== See also ==
- Government of Uttar Pradesh
- List of Vidhan Sabha constituencies of Uttar Pradesh
- Rampur district
- Rampur Lok Sabha constituency
- Sixteenth Legislative Assembly of Uttar Pradesh
- Uttar Pradesh
- Uttar Pradesh Legislative Assembly
