= Mohammad Ali Jauhar University =

University in Uttar Pradesh, India

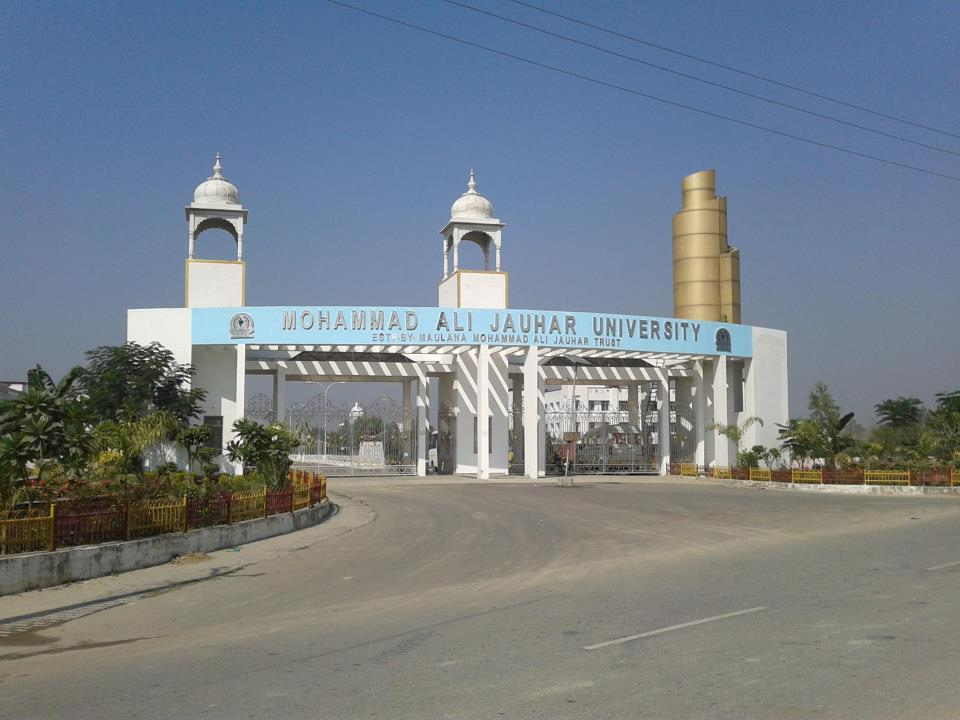
- Other name: MAJ University Rampur
- Motto: اقرأ باسم ربك الذي خلق (Arabic)
- Motto in English: Read! In the Name of your Lord, Who has created (all that exists) (Qur'an 96:1)
- Type: Private
- Established: 2006
- Founder: Azam Khan
- Accreditation: UGC
- Chancellor: Azam Khan
- Vice-Chancellor: Dr. Zaheeruddin
- Students: 3000+
- Location: Rampur, Uttar Pradesh, India; 28°52′36″N 79°01′22″E
- Campus: Rural, 121 hectares (300 acres)
- Website: jauharuniversity.edu.in

Mohammad Ali Jauhar University is a private university established in 2006 by the Mohammad Ali Jauhar Trust in Rampur, Uttar Pradesh, India. It is recognized by the University Grants Commission (UGC). In 2012, it was granted university status. It was also granted minority status by the National Commission for Minority Educational Institutions (NCMEI) on 28 May 2013. The university’s land acquisition has been the subject of controversy. In October 2024, the Supreme Court of India upheld a ruling from the Allahabad High Court allowing the Uttar Pradesh government to terminate the university's land lease.

== Academics ==
=== Jauhar Institute of Medical Sciences ===
- MBBS (proposed)

=== Jauhar Institute of Engineering and Technology ===
Departments

- Electronics and Communication Engineering
- Civil Engineering
- Mechanical Engineering
- Information Technology
- Computer Science and Engineering
- Electrical and Electronics Engineering

=== Mother Teresa Institute of Paramedical Science ===
- Diploma in Optometry
- Diploma in Physiotherapy

=== Mulayam Singh Yadav Faculty of Humanities ===
Departments

- Department of Psychology
- Department of English
- Department of Urdu
- Department of Commerce
- Department of Management

Bachelor's degree programs

- B.Commerce. (Hons)
- B.B.A.
- B.A. (Hons) English
- B.A. (Hons) Psychology

Master's degree programs

- M.A.
- M.B.A.

=== Sir Syed Faculty of Science ===
Bachelor's degree programs

- B.Sc in Physics
- B.Sc in Chemistry
- B.Sc in Mathematics
- B.Sc in Computer Science
- B.Sc in Electronics
- B.Sc in Zoology or Botany
- B.Sc in Biochemistry

Master's degree programs

- M.Sc in Biochemistry
- M.Sc in Statistics
- M.Sc in Mathematics
- M.Sc in Physics

PhD programs

- PhD in Biochemistry
- PhD in Chemistry
- PhD in Zoology

=== Department of Agriculture Science ===
Bachelor's degree programs

- B.Sc (Agriculture)
- M.Sc (Agriculture) Agronomy & Horticulture

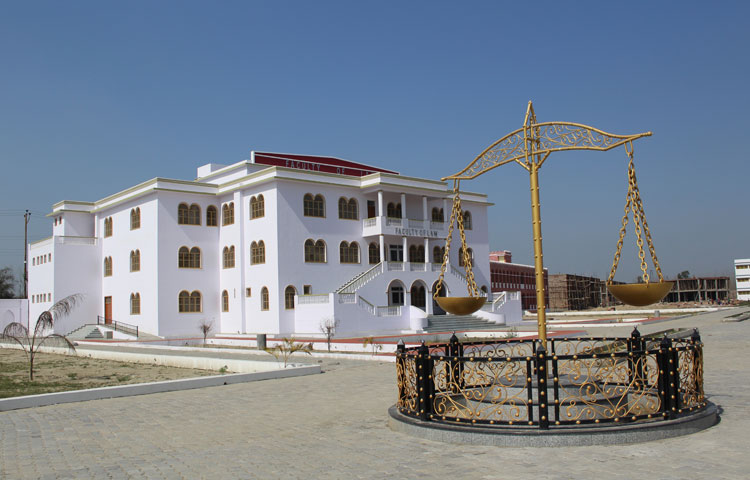
Jauhar: Faculty of Law

=== Faculty of Law ===
- B.A. L.L.B.
- L.L.M.
- Post Graduate Diploma in Human Rights

== History ==
=== Proposal as the First State-owned Urdu University ===
In 2004, it was proposed that a state-owned Urdu university be set up in Rampur, Uttar Pradesh. It was named after Mohammad Ali Jouhar, an Indian Muslim activist, who was one of the leading figures of the Khilafat Movement. The main originator of the idea of an Urdu university was Azam Khan. It would have been the first state-owned Urdu university in the region of Uttar Pradesh. At the time, the proposal to make Azam Khan the lifelong chancellor of the university was not approved by the then-governor, T.V. Rajeshwar. The central government, then controlled by the Indian National Congress, also opposed the bill for an Urdu university. It stated that it would approve the bill if Azam Khan, then MLA of the Samajwadi Party, would cease seeking to be the lifelong chancellor of the University. Since Azam Khan insisted on being appointed lifelong chancellor, the proposal was eventually shelved indefinitely.

=== Samajwadi Party loses power ===
The university faced political challenges for the next five years. In 2006, amidst opposition from political parties, the Chief Minister of Uttar Pradesh, Mulayam Singh Yadav, laid the foundation stone of the University. In 2007, the Samajwadi Party lost the 2007 Vidhan Sabha election, and the Bahujan Samaj Party won a majority in the house. This further worsened conditions for Azam Khan, who was part of the Samajwadi Party and was the main proponent of the university. Finally, in 2009, Azam Khan decided to set up an engineering college on the university premises instead. Azam Khan's idea of a state-owned Urdu university was beginning to pave the way for a full-fledged, privately owned university. For the next three years, the engineering college by the name Jauhar College of Engineering and Technology operated on university premises affiliated with the Mahamaya Technical University.

=== Samajwadi Party comes to power ===
A major uplift to the university was seen in 2012 when the Samajwadi Party came to power. The issue was promoted, and in July, Uttar Pradesh Chief Minister Akhilesh Yadav finally authorized the university to start admissions as a full-fledged private university.

=== Inauguration of the university ===
After eight years of struggle, the university was finally inaugurated on September 18th, 2012, by Mulayam Singh Yadav, the founder of the Samajwadi Party. The inauguration was attended by many members of the Samajwadi Party, as well as the Chief Minister of Uttar Pradesh, Akhilesh Yadav.

Mulayam Singh Yadav said that Azam Khan had rendered "an unmatched service for the upliftment of the community and society." Calling it a historical moment, he said that the roles of Maulana Mohammad Ali Jauhar and his brother Shaukat Ali were very significant in the freedom struggle. Yadav said that the way to development was education. He also called for more educational institutions for minorities. He requested the Chief Minister to consider opening a medical college at the university. He further said that after the Aligarh Muslim University, Rampur will now be remembered as the Mohammad Ali Jauhar University.

=== Termination of the University's Land Lease ===
In 2023, the Uttar Pradesh government cancelled the university's land lease, citing a violation of the lease's conditions. The government claimed that the lease was granted for the establishment of a research institute, but a university had been established on the land instead.

The Maulana Mohammad Ali Jauhar Trust sued, requesting the Allahabad High Court to reverse the termination of the lease. In March of 2024, the High Court denied the request, allowing for the termination of the lease. The trust's attorney appealed the decision to the Supreme Court of India, which sided with the Allahabad High Court in October of the same year, refusing to consider the appeal.

== Infrastructure ==
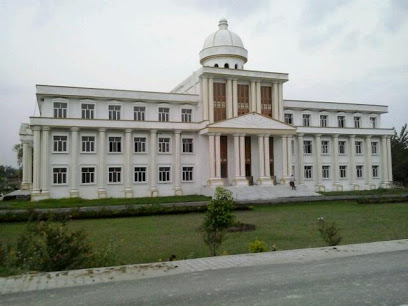
The Mumtaz Central Library is one of the University's landmarks.

The university buildings are still under construction, and most of the work is set to be completed in the near future.

The envisioned university consists of a school of humanities, a school of law, a school of education, a school of engineering and technology, a school of nursing, as well as a medical college. Two-thirds of the 300-acre plan for a fully developed campus has already been acquired.

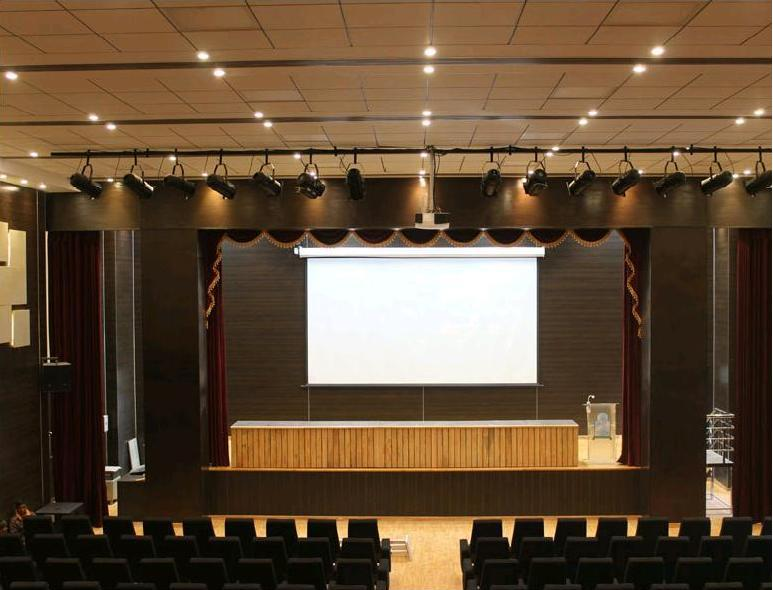
Auditorium in Mohammad Ali Jauhar University

Attention has also been given to the development of sporting facilities. Sports fields for football, hockey, and cricket have been proposed. A mini-stadium with athletic tracks, a gymnasium, and a horse riding club has also been designed.

Moreover, a 478-seat auditorium building will contain a main hall and green rooms.

== Location ==
The university campus is approximately 6 km from the city of Rampur. It is situated along the Kosi River, which forms its natural boundary. The Kosi River flows alongside the university for a distance of two and a half miles.

== Photo gallery ==
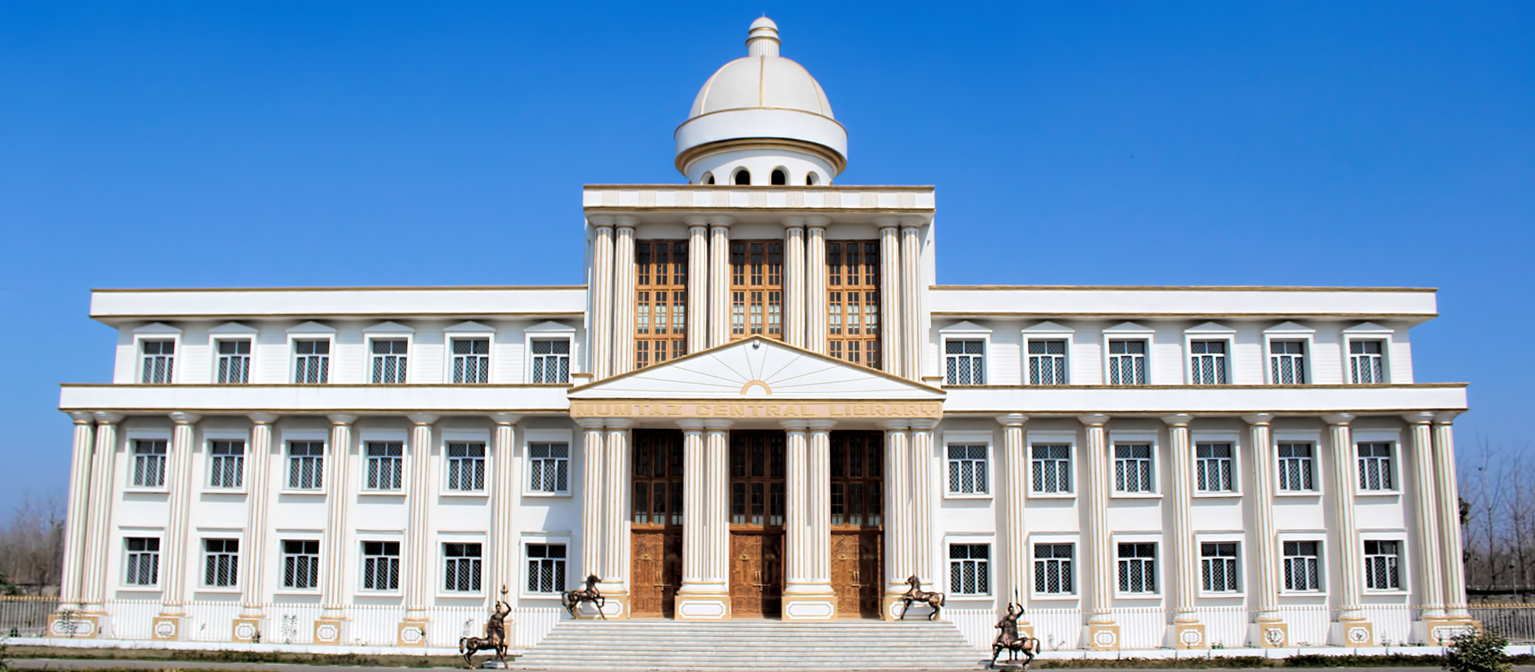

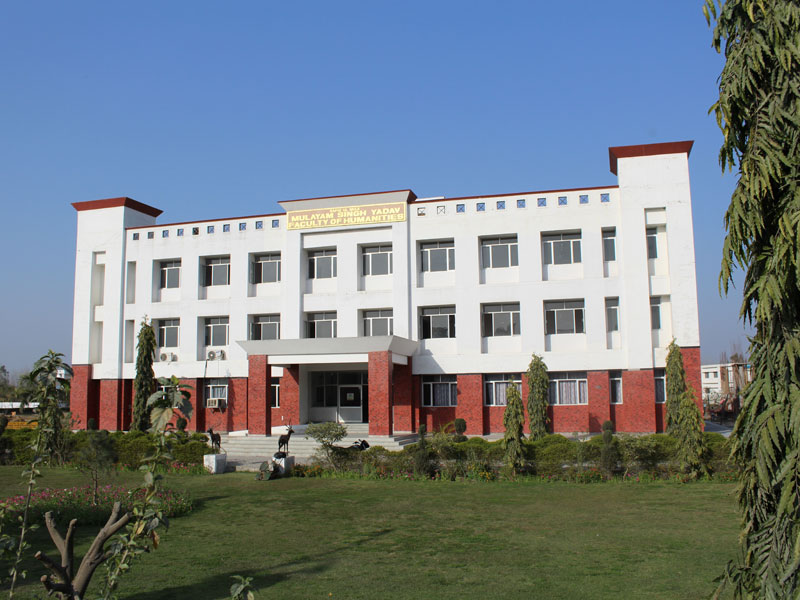
Mulayam Singh Yadav Faculty of Humanities
