= Bilaspur, Uttar Pradesh =

Bilaspur
- Town
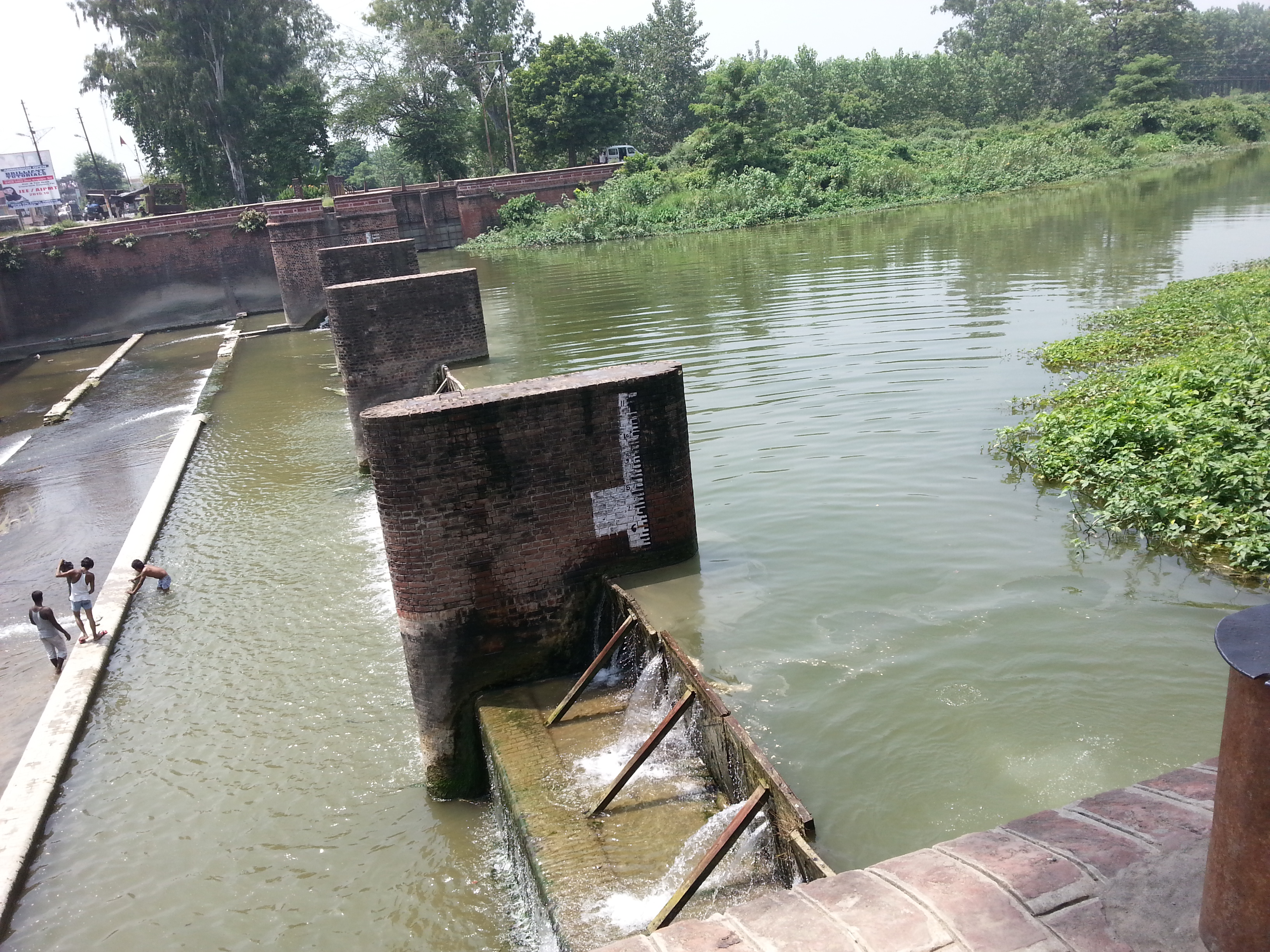
- Dam on Bhakra river, Bilaspur

- Location within Uttar Pradesh Location within India
- Coordinates: 28°53′20″N 79°15′58″E
- Country: India
- State: Uttar Pradesh
- District: Rampur
- Elevation: 274 m (899 ft)

Population (2011)
  - Total: 35,729

Languages
  - Official: Hindi, English, Urdu, Punjabi
- Time zone: UTC+5:30 (IST)
- Postal code: 244921
- Vehicle registration: UP-22
- Website: http://bilaspuronline.com/

Bilaspur is a town and tehsil in Rampur district, Uttar Pradesh. India on the bank of Bhakra river. It is situated on the Nainital road 30 kilometres (19 mi) from Rampur on NH-87 and 15 km from Rudrapur. 30% of the population is Muslim, 20% are Gangwar, Lodhi, 20% are Sikhs and the remaining 30% is Kayastha, Khatri, Jatav, and Bania and other castes. The main source of income is farming and Business, although new industries are coming. The major crops are rice, wheat, pea, sugarcane and vegetables. Mango, guava and papaya are grown here.

== Geography ==
Bilaspur is located at 28.889°N 79.266°E. It has an average elevation of 144 metres (472 feet).

== Demographics ==
As of the 2001 Census of India, Bilaspur had a population of 35,729. Males constitute 53% of the population and females 47%.

=== Languages ===
While Hindi and Urdu are respectively the official and second official languages of the state of Uttar Pradesh, Punjabi is spoken by 47% of the population of Bilaspur.

== Administration ==
Bilaspur Municipal Board

This body is responsible for administration of Bilaspur Town area. Present chairman of the municipal board is Chitrak Mittal, while charge of Executive officer is with SDM Mayank Goswami P.C.S .

Assembly Representative & District Magistrate

The present MLA and SDM of Bilaspur are Shri Baldev Singh Aulakh and Shri Mayank Goswami P.C.S respectively.

== Education ==
Bilaspur has one engineering college, Apex Institute of Technology and one nursing college, PSM Nursing College. Apart from that Bilaspur has one Govt PG College and 4 Govt Inter colleges.
