= Bilaspur, Tripura Assembly constituency =

Constituency of the Tripura legislative assembly in India

Coordinates: 24.26°N 92.02°E

Bilaspur
- Former constituency for the Tripura Legislative Assembly

Constituency details
- Country: India
- Region: Northeast India
- State: Tripura
- Established: 1971
- Abolished: 1976
- Total electors: 10,957

Bilaspur Assembly constituency was an assembly constituency in the Indian state of Tripura.

== Members of the Legislative Assembly ==
| Election | Member | Party |
|---|---|---|
| 1972 | Subal Chandra Biswas | Indian National Congress |

== Election results ==
=== 1972 Assembly election ===
1972 Tripura Legislative Assembly election: Bilaspur
| Party | Candidate | Votes | % | ±% |
|---|---|---|---|---|
| INC | Subal Chandra Biswas | 4,228 | 56.82% | New |
| CPI(M) | Barindra Malaker | 2,230 | 29.97% | New |
| Independent | Baikuntha Malaker | 983 | 13.21% | New |
| Margin of victory | | 1,998 | 26.85% | |
| Turnout | | 7,441 | 70.01% | |
| Registered electors | | 10,957 | | |
| INC win (new seat) | | | | |
