= Zulfikar Ali Khan of Rampur =

Indian politician (1934-1992)

Nawab Sayyid Zulfikar Ali Khan Bahadur, NH (11 March 1934 – 5 April 1992) was an Indian politician and an Indian army officer who ruled as Titular Nawab of Rampur from 1982 to 1992, succeeding his elder brother Murtaza Ali Khan Bahadur.

== Early life ==
Zulfikar Ali Khan Bahadur was born at Rampur on 11 March 1934, the second son of Nawab Sir Sayyid Raza Ali Khan Bahadur. He was commissioned into the Indian Army. He retired from the army as a Major, then worked as a tea planter in Assam for several years. In 1963, Zulfikar Ali entered the Uttar Pradesh Legislative Assembly and served there for three years before becoming an MP in the Lok Sabha in 1967. In 1971, he was the Indian delegate to the 26th UN General Assembly.

== Politics ==
After retiring from the Indian Army as a major, Nawab Zulfikar Ali entered the Uttar Pradesh Legislative Assembly and served there for three years before becoming an MP (Rampur) in the Lok Sabha in 1967. He represented the Swatantra Party in the fourth general elections (4/3/1967 – 27/12/1970). He served as a Member of Parliament for four years before switching parties in the next general elections.

He won the next general election (15/3/1971 – 18/1/1977) as a member of the Indian National Congress, becoming a member of the Fifth Lok Sabha.

In a major turn of events, the Congress lost control of India for the first time in independent India in the Indian general election, (23/3/1977 – 22/8/1979). The election came after the end of The Emergency that Prime Minister Gandhi had imposed in 1975; it effectively ended democracy, suppressed the opposition, and took control of the media with authoritarian measures. The opposition called for a restoration of democracy and Indians saw the election results as a repudiation of the Emergency. The sixth general elections, which were conducted for 542 seats from 542 constituencies, represented 27 Indian states and union territories. The state of Emergency declared by the Congress government was the core issue in the 1977 elections. Civil liberties were suspended during the national emergency from 25 June 1975 to 21 March 1977 and Prime Minister Indira Gandhi assumed vast powers. Gandhi had become extremely unpopular for her decision and paid for it during the elections. Gandhi, on 23 January, called fresh elections for March and released all political prisoners. Four Opposition parties, the Organisation Congress, the Jan Sangh, the Bharatiya Lok Dal and the Socialist Party, decided to fight the elections as a single party, called the Janata Party. The Janata Party reminded voters of excesses and human rights violations during the Emergency, like compulsory sterilisation and imprisonment of political leaders. The Janata campaign said the elections would decide whether India would have "democracy or dictatorship." The Congress tried to woo voters by speaking about the need for a strong government but the tide was against it. The Indian National Congress lost all its seats in Uttar Pradesh and the Nawab too had to leave his seat. However, the Nawab came back strongly from his past defeat and won the seventh general elections (10/1/1980 – 31/12/1984) as a member of the Indian National Congress becoming a member of the Seventh Lok Sabha.

Zulfikar Ali Khan served as a Member of Parliament for four years before he contested the eighth general elections (31/12/1984 – 27/11/1989). Once again, he won the election by a large number of votes and became a member of the Eighth Lok Sabha representing the Indian National Congress.

The next general elections were held in 1989. The ninth general elections (2/12/1989 – 13/3/1991) and proved to be an uphill task for the Indian National Congress. The result was a loss for the Indian National Congress and Rajiv Gandhi, because all the opposition parties formed together a minority government under V. P. Singh and the National Front. The National Front was able to secure the first minority government, since 1947 Independence, with the help of the Left Parties and Bharatiya Janata Party. Even though Rajiv Gandhi had won the last election by a landslide, this election saw him trying to fight off scandals that had marred his administration. The Congress only managed to win fifteen out of the eighty five seats in Uttar Pradesh out of which one seat belonged to Nawab Zulfikar Ali Khan. He went on to become a member of the Ninth Lok Sabha.

He contested a total of seven general elections, winning five and losing two.

== Titular Nawab ==
Following his brother's death on 8 February 1982, Zulfikar Ali succeeded him as titular Nawab of Rampur.

== Personal life ==
In 1956, Zulfikar Ali Khan Bahadur married Her Highness Nawab Mehtab Dulhan uz-Zamani Roshan Ara Noor Bano Begum Sahiba (11 November 1939–), the daughter of Amin ud-din Ahmad Khan, the Governor of Himachal Pradesh and Nawab of Loharu. The couple had one son, Muhammad Kazim Ali Khan Bahadur (16 October 1960–), and two daughters.

== Death ==
The Nawab was killed in a motor crash, on 5 April 1992, and was succeeded by his surviving son, Muhammad Kazim Ali Khan Bahadur.

== Titles ==
- 1934-1950s: Nawabzada Sayyid Zulfikar Ali Khan, Wali Ahad Bahadur
- 1950s–1970s: Nawabzada Sayyid Zulfikar Ali Khan
- 1970s–1982: Nawabzada Sayyid Zulfikar Ali Khan, Wali Ahad Bahadur
- 1982–1992: His Highness 'Ali Jah, Farzand-i-Dilpazir-i-Daulat-i-Inglishia, Mukhlis ud-Daula, Nasir ul-Mulk, Amir ul-Umara, Nawab Sayyid Zulfikar Ali Khan Bahadur, Mustaid Jang, Nawab of Rampur

== Awards and honours ==
- Order of Hamid (Nishan-i-Hamidiya) of Rampur, 2nd Class (to 1982)

Zulfikar Ali Khan of Rampur Rohilla Dynasty Born: 11 March 1934 Died: 5 April 1992
Titles in pretence
Preceded by Murtaza Ali Khan Bahadur	— TITULAR — Nawab of Rampur; 1982–1992; Reason for succession failure: Monarchy abolished in 1949	Succeeded by Muhammad Kazim Ali Khan Bahadur
