= Rampur district =

Coordinates: 28°48′00″N 79°01′12″E

- District of Uttar Pradesh
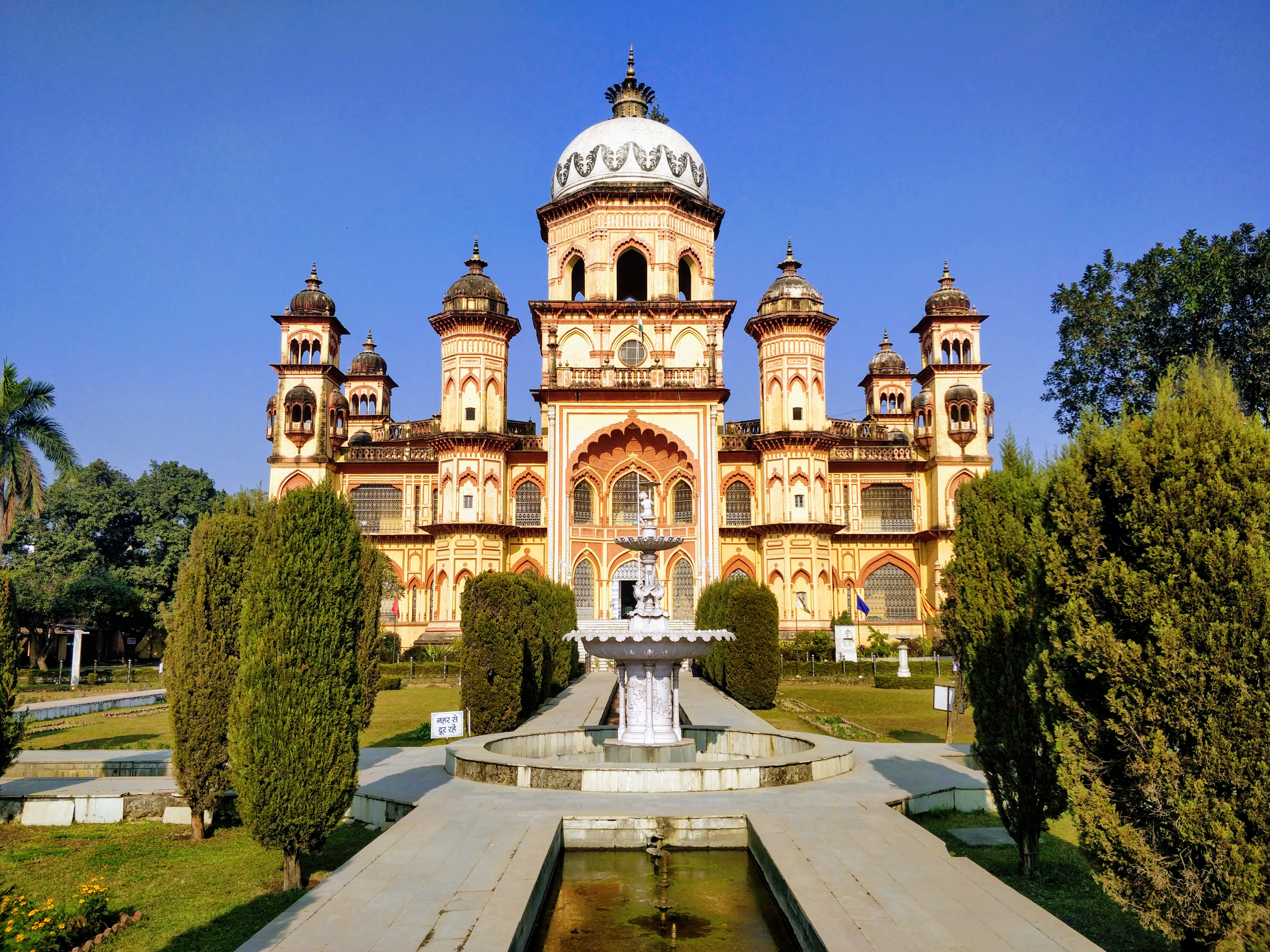
- Raza Library in Rampur

- Location of Rampur district in Uttar Pradesh
- Country: India
- State: Uttar Pradesh
- Division: Moradabad
- Headquarters: Rampur

Government
  - District Magistrate: Ajay Kumar Dwivedi, (IAS)
  - Lok Sabha constituency: Rampur
  - Lok Sabha MP: Mohibbullah Nadvi
  - Vidhan Sabha constituencies: 5

Area
  - Total: 2,367 km^{2} (914 sq mi)

Population
  - Total: 2,335,819
  - Density: 986.8/km^{2} (2,556/sq mi)

Demographics
  - Literacy: 53.34
- Time zone: UTC+05:30 (IST)
- Vehicle registration: UP-22
- Website: rampur.nic.in

Rampur district is one of the districts of Uttar Pradesh state of India, and Rampur town is the district headquarters. Rampur district is a part of Moradabad division. The district occupies an area of 2,367 km^{2} (914 sq mi).

== Demographics ==
Historical population
Year	Pop.	±% p.a.
1901	546,151	—
1911	544,695	−0.03%
1921	466,059	−1.55%
1931	478,343	+0.26%
1941	491,794	+0.28%
1951	560,017	+1.31%
1961	701,537	+2.28%
1971	901,209	+2.54%
1981	1,178,621	+2.72%
1991	1,502,141	+2.46%
2001	1,923,739	+2.50%
2011	2,335,819	+1.96%

Religions in Rampur district (2011)
Religion	Percent
Islam	50.57%
Hinduism	45.97%
Sikhism	2.80%
Other or not stated	0.66%
Distribution of religions

According to the 2011 Census of India, Rampur district has a population of 2,335,819, roughly equal to the nation of Latvia or the US state of New Mexico. This gives it a ranking of 194th among India's 640 districts. The district has a population density of 987 inhabitants per square kilometre (2,560/sq mi). Its population growth rate over the decade 2001-2011 was 21.4%. Rampur has a sex ratio of 905 females for every 1000 males, and a literacy rate of 53.34%. 25.20% of the population live in urban areas. Scheduled Castes make up 13.18% of the population.

Religions in Rampur by tehsil (2011)
Tehsils	Muslims	Hindus	Sikhs	Others
Suar	61.23%	33.72%	4.31%	0.74%
Tanda	62.04%	36.96%	0.54%	0.46%
Bilaspur	45.15%	40.48%	12.86%	1.51%
Rampur	61.58%	37.14%	0.71%	0.57%
Shahabad	37.33%	62.01%	0.27%	0.39%
Milak	24.80%	73.00%	1.71%	0.49%

Islam is the majority religion in the district. Three out of five tehsils in Rampur have a Muslim majority and one a Muslim plurality. Hindus are majority in rural areas, while Muslims predominate in urban areas. Sikhs are a significant minority in Bilaspur and Suar tehsils, while Christians are a small minority in concentrated in Rampur city.

Languages of Rampur district (2011)
1. Hindi (73.8%)
2. Urdu (23.0%)
3. Punjabi (2.54%)
4. Others (0.57%)

At the time of the 2011 Census of India, 73.85% of the population of the district spoke Hindi, 23.04% Urdu and 2.54% Punjabi as their first language. There are also some Bengali speakers in Bilaspur tehsil. The Punjabis and Bengalis are the refugees and their descendants from modern Pakistan and Bangladesh who were settled in the district during Partition.

== Notable people ==
- Ali Yusuf Ali, Indian politician
- Muhammad Kazim Ali Khan, Indian politician
- Azam Khan, Indian politician
- Mohammad Ali, Pakistani Actor
- Mohammad Ali Jauhar
- Maulana Shaukhat Ali, Politician
- Sahabzada Yaqub Khan
- Raza Murad
- Murad (actor)
- Rukhsar Rehman
- Athar Shah Khan Jaidi
- Javed Siddiqui
- Zohra Sehgal
- Uzra Butt

== See also ==
- Other places with name Rampur
