= Regulation of artificial intelligence =

Regulation of artificial intelligence is the development of public-sector policies and laws to promote and regulate artificial intelligence (AI). AI regulation has become an increasingly important issue in jurisdictions worldwide, alongside guidance developed by organizations without direct enforcement power, such as the IEEE, IPIE, and OECD.

Since 2016, numerous AI ethics guidelines have been published in order to maintain social control over the technology. Organizations deploying AI also play a central role in creating and implementing trustworthy AI, adhering to established principles, and taking accountability for mitigating risks. In 2024, the European Union adopted the AI Act, establishing a common legal framework for AI.

AI governance is a term used in policy, industry, and academic contexts to describe how AI systems are directed and overseen. A 2025 systematic literature review defined it as encompassing the questions of who is accountable for AI systems, what elements are governed, when governance occurs within the development lifecycle, and how it is implemented through frameworks, tools, or models. Charlotte Stix noted that related terms, including "trustworthy AI", "responsible AI", and "ethical AI", have shifted in meaning over time and are often used interchangeably.

== Background ==
Mitchell Waldrop used the term "machine ethics" in a 1987 article in AI Magazine. In 2005, the AAAI held a symposium on machine ethics. A 2019 study by Anna Jobin, Marcello Ienca, and Effy Vayena identified 84 sets of AI ethics guidelines published worldwide, 88% of which had been released after 2016. The guidelines showed agreement on five principles: transparency, justice, non-maleficence, responsibility, and privacy. The Partnership on AI was established in 2016 by Apple, Amazon, Google, Facebook, IBM, and Microsoft. The IEEE launched its Global Initiative on Ethics of Autonomous and Intelligent Systems in 2016. The initiative published Ethically Aligned Design in 2019.

According to Stanford University's 2025 AI Index, legislative mentions of AI rose 21.3% across 75 countries since 2023, marking a ninefold increase since 2016. The U.S. federal agencies introduced 59 AI-related regulations in 2024—more than double the number in 2023. In 2024, nearly 700 AI-related bills were introduced across 45 states, up from 191 in 2023.

There is currently no broad consensus on the degree or mechanics of AI regulation. Several prominent figures in the field, including Sam Altman, Dario Amodei, Demis Hassabis, and Elon Musk have publicly called for immediate regulation of AI. In 2023, following GPT-4's creation, Elon Musk and others signed an open letter urging a moratorium on the training of more powerful AI systems. Others, such as Mark Zuckerberg and Marc Andreessen, have warned about the risk of preemptive regulation stifling innovation.

In a 2022 Ipsos survey, attitudes towards AI varied greatly by country; 78% of Chinese citizens, but only 35% of Americans, agreed that "products and services using AI have more benefits than drawbacks". Ipsos poll found that 61% of Americans agree, and 22% disagree, that AI poses risks to humanity.

In 2023, the United Kingdom started a series of international summits on AI with the AI Safety Summit. It was followed by the AI Seoul Summit in 2024, the AI Action Summit in Paris in 2025, and the AI Impact Summit in New Delhi in 2026.

== Perspectives ==
The regulation of artificial intelligence is the development of public sector policies and laws for promoting and regulating AI. Public administration and policy considerations generally focus on the technical and economic implications and on trustworthy and human-centered AI systems, regulation of artificial superintelligence, the risks and biases of machine-learning algorithms, the explainability of model outputs, and the tension between open source AI and unchecked AI use.

There have been both hard law and soft law proposals to regulate AI. Some legal scholars have noted that hard law approaches to AI regulation have substantial challenges. Among the challenges, AI technology is rapidly evolving leading to a "pacing problem" where traditional laws and regulations often cannot keep up with emerging applications and their associated risks and benefits. Similarly, the diversity of AI applications challenges existing regulatory agencies, which often have limited jurisdictional scope. As an alternative, some legal scholars argue that soft law approaches to AI regulation are promising, as they offer greater flexibility to adapt to emerging technologies and the evolving nature of AI applications. However, soft law approaches often lack substantial enforcement potential.

Cason Schmit, Megan Doerr, and Jennifer Wagner proposed the creation of a quasi-governmental regulator by leveraging intellectual property rights (i.e., copyleft licensing) in certain AI objects (i.e., AI models and training datasets) and delegating enforcement rights to a designated enforcement entity. They argue that AI can be licensed under terms that require adherence to specified ethical practices and codes of conduct. (e.g., soft law principles).

Prominent youth organizations focused on AI, namely Encode AI, have also issued comprehensive agendas calling for more stringent AI regulations and public-private partnerships.

AI regulation could derive from basic principles. A formal systematic review by the International Panel on the Information Environment, a Zurich-based science body, found that regardless of the specific values expressed, AI regulation must provide shared standards, independent verification, auditor access to evidence, transparent audit results, and a broad understanding of AI impacts. An A 2020 Berkman Klein Center for Internet & Society literature review of several existing sets of principles, such as the Asilomar Principles and the Beijing Principles, identified eight such basic principles: privacy, accountability, safety and security, transparency and explainability, fairness and non-discrimination, human control of technology, professional responsibility, and respect for human values. AI law and regulations have been divided into three main topics, namely governance of autonomous intelligence systems, responsibility and accountability for the systems, and privacy and safety issues. A public administration approach sees a relationship between AI law and regulation, the ethics of AI, and 'AI society', defined as workforce substitution and transformation, social acceptance and trust in AI, and the transformation of human to machine interaction. The development of public sector strategies for management and regulation of AI is deemed necessary at the local, national, and international levels and in a variety of fields, from public service management and accountability to law enforcement, healthcare (especially the concept of a Human Guarantee), the financial sector, robotics, autonomous vehicles, the military and national security, and international law.

Henry Kissinger, Eric Schmidt, and Daniel Huttenlocher published a joint statement in November 2021 entitled "Being Human in an Age of AI", calling for a government commission to regulate AI.

A 2025 study found competition law and competition regulators face challenges in preventing a winner-take-all market for AI.

In 2025, the UK and US governments declined to sign an international agreement on AI at the AI Action Summit in Paris. The agreement was described as proposing an open, inclusive and ethical approach to AI development, including environmental protection measures. US Vice President JD Vance argued that the agreement would be detrimental to the growth of the AI industry. The UK government added that the agreement "didn't provide enough practical clarity on global governance, nor sufficiently address harder questions around national security".

=== As a response to the AI control problem ===
Regulation of AI can be seen as positive social means to manage the AI control problem (the need to ensure long-term beneficial AI), with other social responses such as doing nothing or banning being seen as impractical, and approaches such as enhancing human capabilities through transhumanism techniques like brain-computer interfaces being seen as potentially complementary. Regulation of research into artificial general intelligence (AGI) focuses on the role of review boards, from university or corporation to international levels, and on encouraging research into AI safety, together with the possibility of differential intellectual progress (prioritizing protective strategies over risky strategies in AI development) or conducting international mass surveillance to perform AGI arms control. For instance, the 'AGI Nanny' is a proposed strategy, potentially under the control of humanity, for preventing the creation of a dangerous superintelligence as well as for addressing other major threats to human well-being, such as subversion of the global financial system, until a true superintelligence can be safely created. It entails the creation of a smarter-than-human, but not superintelligent, AGI system connected to a large surveillance network, with the goal of monitoring humanity and protecting it from danger. Regulation of conscious, ethically aware AGIs focuses on how to integrate them with existing human society and can be divided into considerations of their legal standing and of their moral rights. Regulation of AI has been seen as restrictive, with a risk of preventing the development of AGI.

=== Agentic AI regulation ===
The increased development and deployment of AI agents has shifted regulation discussion beyond generative AI. Agentic AI regulation is in early stages compared to generative AI systems, which have already had many regulations implemented or proposed. AI agents are more complex, more autonomous, and have less human oversight.

Kathrin Gardhouse et al. propose the idea of the many-hands problem through the lens of the EU Artificial Intelligence Act. Standard generative AI systems can be evaluated at the deployment stage. Then they can receive human oversight for each action as a single entity. AI agents, on the other hand, can work with multiple actors within multiple systems. This makes regulating their actions more difficult, especially when AI agents are compounded. Gardhouse et al. argue that AI agents have too many dynamic variables to have specific regulations based on fixed points in time. This may require more focus on system environments, record-keeping, and the agents themselves.

AI agents, by design, function with more limited human oversight. Recent articles, such as Governing AI Agents, convey doubts over whether regulatory frameworks for generative AI can effectively solve regulatory issues for AI agents. One approach is to have other deep learning systems or AI agents specifically monitor subsequent AI agents as an oversight measure. However, researchers maintain concerns that those could lead to the same types of vulnerabilities.

On June 29, 2026, United States Senator Mark Warner put forward a discussion draft for the Artificial Intelligence Access, Gatekeeper Exchange, and Nondiscriminatory Transfer Act (AI AGENT Act). This proposed discussion draft is geared toward a federal framework for consumer-facing AI agents. Access to large platforms, privacy, and security are the main concerns.

=== Regulation of fully autonomous weapons ===
Under the Convention on Certain Conventional Weapons, states have held discussions since 2014 on possible international rules for lethal autonomous weapon systems, an important area of AI regulation in warfare. Notably, informal meetings of experts took place in 2014, 2015 and 2016 and a Group of Governmental Experts (GGE) was appointed to further deliberate on the issue in 2016. A set of guiding principles on LAWS affirmed by the GGE on LAWS were adopted in 2018. The discussions have addressed international humanitarian law, accountability, possible prohibitions and regulations, and the extent of human control required over AI-enabled weapons.

In 2016, China published a position paper questioning the adequacy of existing international law to address the eventuality of fully autonomous weapons, becoming the first permanent member of the U.N. Security Council to broach the issue, and leading to proposals for global regulation. The possibility of a moratorium or preemptive ban of the development and use of LAWS has also been raised on several occasions by other national delegations to the Convention on Certain Conventional Weapons and is strongly advocated for by the Campaign to Stop Killer Robots – a coalition of non-governmental organizations. The US government maintains that current international humanitarian law is capable of regulating the development or use of LAWS. The Congressional Research Service indicated in 2023 that the US does not have LAWS in its inventory, but that its policy does not prohibit the development and employment of it.

=== Global ===
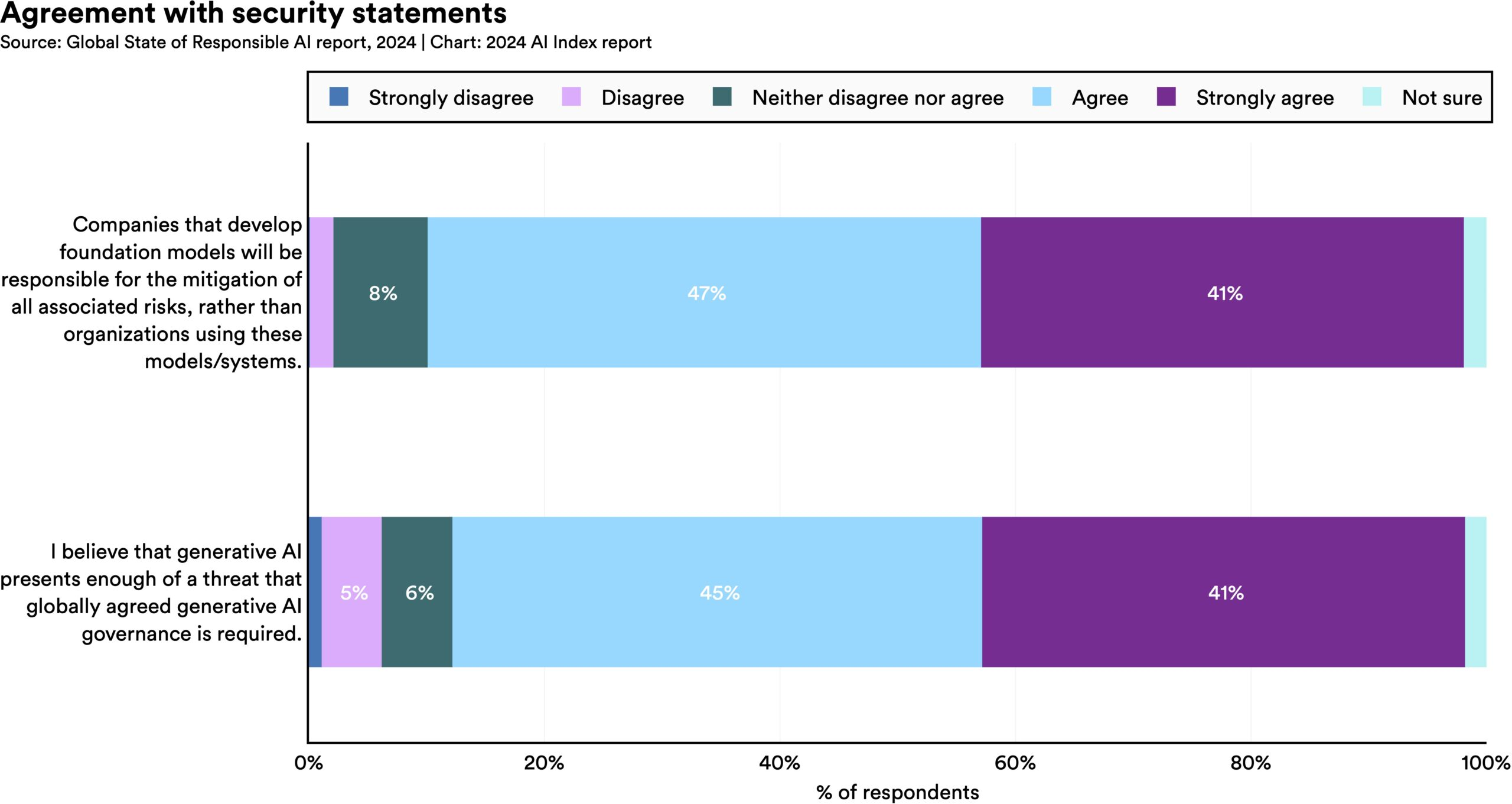
Organizations polled largely agree that companies developing foundation models will be responsible for associated risks (rather than those using it), and that global governance is required to address risks from generative AI.

The development of a global governance board to regulate AI development was suggested at least as early as 2017. In December 2018, Canada and France announced plans for a G7-backed International Panel on Artificial Intelligence, modeled on the International Panel on Climate Change, to study the global effects of AI on people and economies and to steer AI development. In 2019, the Panel was renamed the Global Partnership on AI.

The Global Partnership on Artificial Intelligence (GPAI) was launched in June 2020, stating a need for AI to be developed in accordance with human rights and democratic values, to ensure public confidence and trust in the technology, as outlined in the OECD Principles on Artificial Intelligence (2019). The 15 founding members of the Global Partnership on Artificial Intelligence are Australia, Canada, the European Union, France, Germany, India, Italy, Japan, the Republic of Korea, Mexico, New Zealand, Singapore, Slovenia, the United States and the UK. In 2023, the GPAI has 29 members. The GPAI Secretariat is hosted by the OECD in Paris, France. GPAI's mandate covers four themes, two of which are supported by the International Centre of Expertise in Montréal for the Advancement of Artificial Intelligence, namely, responsible AI and data governance. A corresponding centre of excellence in Paris will support the other two themes on the future of work, and on innovation and commercialization. GPAI also investigated how AI can be leveraged to respond to the COVID-19 pandemic. The GPAI, the OECD AI Policy Observatory, and the United Nations High-Level Advisory Body on Artificial Intelligence serve as multilateral coordination bodies.

At the United Nations (UN), several entities have begun to promote and discuss aspects of AI regulation and policy, including the UNICRI Centre for AI and Robotics. In partnership with INTERPOL, UNICRI's Centre issued the report AI and Robotics for Law Enforcement in April 2019 and the follow-up report Towards Responsible AI Innovation in May 2020. At UNESCO's Scientific 40th session in November 2019, the organization commenced a two-year process to achieve a "global standard-setting instrument on ethics of artificial intelligence". In pursuit of this goal, UNESCO forums and conferences on AI were held to gather stakeholder views. A draft text of a Recommendation on the Ethics of AI of the UNESCO Ad Hoc Expert Group was issued in September 2020 and included a call for legislative gaps to be filled. UNESCO tabled the international instrument on the ethics of AI for adoption at its General Conference in November 2021; this was subsequently adopted by all 193 member states. While the UN is making progress with the global management of AI, its institutional and legal capability to manage the AGI existential risk is more limited.

On August 26, 2025, the United Nations Resolution A/RES/79/325 established the Independent International Scientific Panel on AI and the Global Dialogue on AI Governance. The UN calls the panel the "first global scientific body on Artificial Intelligence". The resolution mandates the panel to produce an annual report using evidence-based scientific assessments on the opportunities, risks, and impacts of artificial intelligence. The report is to be presented every year at the Global Dialogue on AI Governance. The panel may also prepare briefs on issues of concern, provide biannual updates to the General Assembly, form working groups, or act as informal consultants. In 2026, the first session of the Global Dialogue on AI Governance will take place in Geneva, Switzerland on July 6 and 7. It will be co-chaired by Egriselda López (Permanent Representative of El Salvador to the United Nations) and Rein Tammsaar (Permanent Representative of Estonia to the United Nations).

In recent years, academic researchers have made more efforts to promote multilateral dialogue and policy development, advocating for the adoption of international frameworks that govern the deployment of AI in military and cybersecurity contexts, with a strong emphasis on human rights and international humanitarian law. Initiatives such as the Munich Convention on AI, Data and Human Rights, which brought together scholars from various academic institutions, have called for a binding international agreement to protect human rights in the age of AI. A key element of such initiatives is identifying common ground between different regional approaches, such as those of the African Union and the Council of Europe.

In September 2025, a global call for AI red lines was presented at the United Nations General Assembly, urging governments to reach a binding agreement prohibiting unacceptable AI uses and behaviors by the end of 2026.

The OECD's Recommendation on Artificial Intelligence and its AI Principles were adopted in May 2019 (and amended in 2024). The framework includes five value-based principles: inclusive growth, human-centred values, transparency, robustness, and accountability. More than 40 countries have adopted it. The G20 AI Principles followed in June 2019. In September 2019 the World Economic Forum issued ten "AI Government Procurement Guidelines".

The AI Safety Summit was held at Bletchley Park in November 2023. The AI Seoul Summit took place in 2024. The AI Action Summit was held in Paris in February 2025. The India AI Impact Summit took place in New Delhi in February 2026.

== Regional and national regulation ==
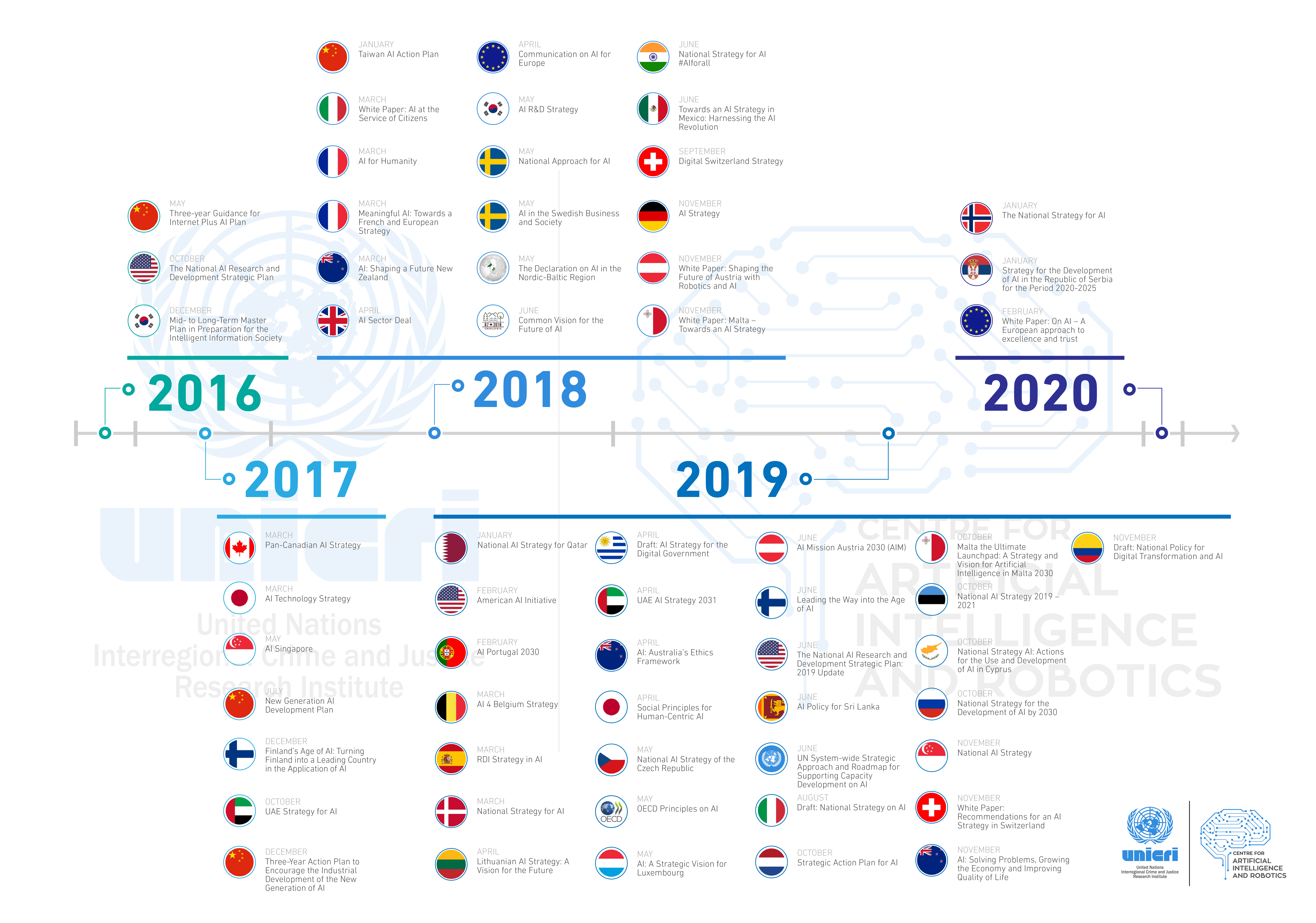
Timeline of strategies, action plans and policy papers setting defining national, regional and international approaches to AI

The regulatory and policy landscape for AI is an emerging issue in regional and national jurisdictions globally, for example in the European Union and Russia. Since early 2016, many national, regional and international authorities have begun adopting strategies, actions plans and policy papers on AI. These documents cover a wide range of topics such as regulation and governance, as well as industrial strategy, research, talent and infrastructure.

Different countries have approached the problem in different ways. Regarding the three largest economies, it has been said by Anu Bradford, a law professor at Columbia University, that "the United States is following a market-driven approach, China is advancing a state-driven approach, and the EU is pursuing a rights-driven approach."

=== African Union ===
The African Union (AU) has increasingly been active in the field. Most importantly, the African Commission on Human and Peoples' Rights published a study on AI and human rights and advocated for an African Framework Convention on AI and Human Rights. This initiative builds on earlier debates within the AU, particularly discussions on autonomous lethal weapons, which African representatives had previously raised in international forums.

A distinctive feature of the proposed African Framework is its strong emphasis on collective rights, as enshrined in the African Charter on Human and Peoples' Rights. This approach is situated within the broader debate on aligning AI governance with African values, including ethical traditions such as Ubuntu ("humanity to others").

The AU launched its Continental Artificial Intelligence Strategy to promote the ethical, inclusive and responsible development of AI across Africa. The strategy's development began in 2023, when the AU Specialized Technical Committee on Communication and ICT approved its conceptual framework. Following multi-stakeholder consultations in April 2024, it was endorsed by African ICT ministers in June and formally adopted by the AU Executive Council in July 2024.

=== Australia ===
As of 2025, Australia has not passed AI-specific laws, but existing statutes such as the Privacy Act 1988, Corporations Act 2001, and Online Safety Act 2021 affect AI use.

In October 2023, the Australian Computer Society, Business Council of Australia, Australian Chamber of Commerce and Industry, Ai Group (aka Australian Industry Group), Council of Small Business Organisations Australia, and Tech Council of Australia jointly published an open letter calling for a national approach to AI strategy. The letter backs the federal government establishing a whole-of-government AI taskforce.

In August 2024, the Australian government set a Voluntary AI Safety Standard, which was followed by a Proposals Paper later in September of that year, outlining potential guardrails for high-risk AI that could become mandatory. These guardrails include areas such as model testing, transparency, human oversight, and record-keeping, all of which may be enforced through new legislation.

In September 2024, a bill was introduced which granted the Australian Communications and Media Authority powers to regulate AI-generated misinformation. Several agencies, including the ACMA, ACCC, and Office of the Australian Information Commissioner, are all expected to play roles in future AI regulation.

The South Australian Government appointed a Minister for Artificial Intelligence and Digital Economy for the state of South Australia in March 2026. There is also a Minister for Artificial Intelligence and Digital Economy in the state of Victoria.

In 2026, the Global Index on Responsible AI (GIRAI), ranked Australia 23rd globally out of 135 countries, 1st in the Asia-Pacific region, and 22nd among high-income countries.

=== Brazil ===
On September 30, 2021, the Brazilian Chamber of Deputies (Câmara dos Deputados) approved the Brazilian Legal Framework for Artificial Intelligence (Marco Legal da Inteligência Artificial). This legislation aimed to regulate AI development and usage while promoting research and innovation in ethical AI solutions that prioritize culture, justice, fairness, and accountability. The 10-article bill established several key objectives: developing ethical principles for AI, promoting sustained research investment, and removing barriers to innovation. Article 4 specifically emphasized preventing discriminatory AI solutions, ensuring plurality, and protecting human rights.

When the bill was first released to the public, it faced substantial criticism, alarming the government for critical provisions. The underlying issue is that this bill failed to thoroughly and carefully address accountability, transparency, and inclusivity principles. Article VI establishes subjective liability, meaning any individual that is damaged by an AI system and is wishing to receive compensation must specify the stakeholder and prove that there was a mistake in the machine's life cycle. Scholars emphasize that it is out of legal order to assign an individual responsible for proving algorithmic errors given the high degree of autonomy, unpredictability, and complexity of AI systems. This also drew attention to the currently occurring issues with face recognition systems in Brazil leading to unjust arrests by the police, which would then imply that when this bill is adopted, individuals would have to prove and justify these machine errors.

The main controversy of this draft bill was directed to three proposed principles. First, the non-discrimination principle, suggests that AI must be developed and used in a way that merely mitigates the possibility of abusive and discriminatory practices. Secondly, the pursuit of neutrality principle lists recommendations for stakeholders to mitigate biases; however, with no obligation to achieve this goal. Lastly, the transparency principle states that a system's transparency is only necessary when there is a high risk of violating fundamental rights. As easily observed, the Brazilian Legal Framework for Artificial Intelligence lacks binding and obligatory clauses and is rather filled with relaxed guidelines. In fact, experts emphasize that this bill may even make accountability for AI discriminatory biases even harder to achieve. Compared to the EU's proposal of extensive risk-based regulations, the Brazilian Bill has 10 articles proposing vague and generic recommendations.

The Brazilian AI Bill lacks the diverse perspectives that characterized earlier Brazilian internet legislation. When Brazil drafted the Marco Civil da Internet (Brazilian Internet Bill of Rights) in the 2000s, it used a multistakeholder approach that brought together various groups—including government, civil society, academia, and industry—to participate in dialogue, decision-making, and implementation. This collaborative process helps capture different viewpoints and trade-offs among stakeholders with varying interests, ultimately improving transparency and effectiveness in AI regulation.

In May 2023, a new bill was passed, superseding the 2021 bill. It calls for risk assessments of AI systems before deployment and distinguishes "high risk" and "excessive risk" systems. The latter are characterized by their potential to expose or exploit vulnerabilities and will be subject to regulation by the Executive Branch. In the 2026 Global Index on Responsible AI, Brazil was ranked 11th globally out of 135 countries, 1st in South and Central America, and 1st among upper-middle-income countries.

=== Canada ===
The Pan-Canadian Artificial Intelligence Strategy (2017) is supported by federal funding of Can $125 million with the objectives of increasing the number of outstanding AI researchers and skilled graduates in Canada, establishing nodes of scientific excellence at the three major AI centres, developing 'global thought leadership' on the economic, ethical, policy and legal implications of AI advances and supporting a national research community working on AI. The Canada CIFAR AI Chairs Program is the cornerstone of the strategy. It benefits from funding of Can$86.5 million over five years to attract and retain world-renowned AI researchers. The federal government appointed an Advisory Council on AI in May 2019 with a focus on examining how to build on Canada's strengths to ensure that AI advancements reflect Canadian values, such as human rights, transparency and openness. The Advisory Council on AI has established a working group on extracting commercial value from Canadian-owned AI and data analytics. In 2020, the federal government and Government of Quebec announced the opening of the International Centre of Expertise in Montréal for the Advancement of Artificial Intelligence, which will advance the cause of responsible development of AI. In June 2022, the government of Canada started a second phase of the Pan-Canadian Artificial Intelligence Strategy. In November 2022, Canada has introduced the Digital Charter Implementation Act (Bill C-27), which proposes three acts that have been described as a holistic package of legislation for trust and privacy: the Consumer Privacy Protection Act, the Personal Information and Data Protection Tribunal Act, and the Artificial Intelligence & Data Act (AIDA).

In September 2023, the Canadian Government introduced a Voluntary Code of Conduct for the Responsible Development and Management of Advanced generative AI Systems. The code, based initially on public consultations, seeks to provide interim guidance to Canadian companies on responsible AI practices. Ultimately, it is intended to serve as a stopgap until formal legislation, such as the Artificial Intelligence and Data Act (AIDA), is enacted. Moreover, in November 2024, the Canadian government announced the creation of the Canadian Artificial Intelligence Safety Institute (CAISI) as part of a 2.4 billion CAD federal AI investment package. This includes 2 billion CAD to support a new AI Sovereign Computing Strategy and the AI Computing Access Fund, which aims to bolster Canada's advanced computing infrastructure. Further funding includes 700 million CAD for domestic AI development, 1 billion CAD for public supercomputing infrastructure, and 300 million CAD to assist companies in accessing new AI resources.

In the 2026 Global Index on Responsible AI, Canada was ranked 25th globally out of 135 countries, 1st in Northern America, and 24th among high-income countries.

=== China ===
The regulation of AI in China is mainly governed by the State Council of the People's Republic of China's July 8, 2017 "A Next Generation Artificial Intelligence Development Plan" (State Council Document No. 35), in which the Central Committee of the Chinese Communist Party and the State Council of the PRC urged the governing bodies of China to promote the development of AI up to 2030. Regulation of the issues of ethical and legal support for the development of AI is accelerating, and policy ensures state control of Chinese companies and over valuable data, including storage of data on Chinese users within the country and the mandatory use of People's Republic of China's national standards for AI, including over big data, cloud computing, and industrial software. In 2021, China published ethical guidelines for the use of AI in China which state that researchers must ensure that AI abides by shared human values, is always under human control, and is not endangering public safety. In 2023, China introduced Interim Measures for the Management of Generative AI Services.

On August 15, 2023, China's first generative AI measures officially came into force, becoming one of the first comprehensive national regulatory frameworks for generative AI. The measures apply to all providers offering generative AI services to the Chinese public, including foreign entities, ultimately setting the rules related to data protection, transparency, and algorithmic accountability.

In April 2026, China's National Development and Reform Commission ordered Meta to unwind its $2 billion acquisition of Manus, an AI startup that had relocated from China to Singapore in 2025. This marks a rare move to block a completed cross-border tech deal. The decision signals Beijing's effort to prevent foreign firms from acquiring Chinese AI talent and intellectual property, establishing national security review as a regular condition for cross-border technology transactions involving Chinese assets, founders, or technology.

In parallel, earlier regulations such as the Chinese government's Deep Synthesis Provisions (effective January 2023) and the Algorithm Recommendation Provisions (effective March 2022) continue to shape China's governance of AI-driven systems, including requirements for watermarking and algorithm filing with the Cyberspace Administration of China (CAC). Additionally, In October 2023, China also implemented a set of Ethics Review Measures for science and technology, mandating certain ethical assessments of AI projects which were deemed socially sensitive or capable of negatively influencing public opinion. As of mid-2024, over 1,400 AI algorithms had been already registered under the CAC's algorithm filing regime, which includes disclosure requirements and penalties for noncompliance. This layered approach reflects a broader policy process shaped by not only central directives but also academic input, civil society concerns, and public discourse.

Later procedures set out detailed mandatory AI content labeling rules. In 2025, Chinese regulators issued the Measures for Labeling of AI-Generated Synthetic Content. These procedures standardize the use of on-screen disclosure labels and embedded provenance metadata for AI-generated text, images, audio, video, and virtual scenes. Additionally, they introduce a mandatory requirement for online service providers to disclose their name or code and content reference number in the embedded metadata, encourage the use of digital watermarking, require online content platforms to detect or infer AI-generated material and add conspicuous consumer disclosures, and mandate that providers describe their labeling methods in online terms of service.

In the 2026 Global Index on Responsible AI, China was ranked 42nd globally out of 135 countries, 7th in Asia-Pacific, and 6th among upper-middle-income countries.

In September 2026, during the United Nations General Assembly, governments and technology executives discussed international mechanisms for managing AI risks. The United States and China also agreed during the Trump–Xi summit to establish a bilateral dialogue on artificial intelligence and mechanisms for communication about AI-related incidents.

=== Colombia ===
Although Colombia has not issued specific AI laws, this does not mean there is a lack of frameworks or initiatives to govern it. In fact, there are numerous instruments issued for that purpose, including national policies, ethical frameworks, roadmaps, rulings, and guidelines. In addition, there are other existing regulations applicable to AI systems, such as data protection, intellectual property, consumer laws, and civil liability rules.

One of the first specific instruments issued was the CONPES 3920 of 2019, the National Policy on Exploitation of Data (Big Data). The main purpose of this policy was to leverage data in Colombia by creating the conditions to handle it as an asset to generate social and economic value.

Another milestone occurred in 2021, when the National Government published the Ethical Framework for AI in Colombia. It was a soft law guide for public entities, offering recommendations to consider in the management of AI-related projects.

An additional framework for AI was adopted by Colombia in 2022: the Recommendation on the Ethics of Artificial Intelligence by UNESCO. It includes values and principles applicable in the public and private sectors in all stages of the AI system life cycle.

A regional political commitment on AI was made in 2023, involving Latin American and Caribbean countries. It was called the Declaration of Santiago, whose main purpose is to promote ethical AI in the region.

2024 was a prolific year in governing AI in Colombia. A roadmap for an ethical and sustainable AI adoption was launched by the National Government. The Superintendence of Industry and Commerce issued a guide on the processing of personal data in AI systems. The Judiciary Council published a guideline for the use of AI in the judicial sector. In the global context, the OECD principles were updated, the Global Digital Compact by the United Nations was published, and the UN adopted Resolution A/78/L.49 on safe, trustworthy, and reliable AI systems for sustainable development.

In 2025, a new national policy on AI was issued by the National Government, contained in CONPES 4144. The ruling T-067/25 by the Constitutional Court provided some rules for access to public information and transparency of algorithms.

Until Congress issues AI regulations, these soft-law documents can guide the design, development, and use of AI systems in Colombia.

In the 2026 Global Index on Responsible AI, Colombia was ranked 26th globally out of 135 countries, 4th in South and Central America, and 2nd among upper-middle-income countries.

=== Council of Europe ===
The Council of Europe (CoE) is an international organization that promotes human rights, democracy and the rule of law. It comprises 46 member states, including all 29 Signatories of the European Union's 2018 Declaration of Cooperation on Artificial Intelligence. The CoE has created a common legal space in which the members have a legal obligation to guarantee rights as set out in the European Convention on Human Rights. Specifically in relation to AI, "The Council of Europe's aim is to identify intersecting areas between AI and our standards on human rights, democracy and rule of law, and to develop relevant standard setting or capacity-building solutions". The large number of relevant documents identified by the CoE include guidelines, charters, papers, reports and strategies. The authoring bodies of these AI regulation documents are not confined to one sector of society and include organizations, companies, bodies and nation-states.

In 2019, the Council of Europe initiated a process to assess the need for legally binding regulation of AI, focusing specifically on its implications for human rights and democratic values. Negotiations on a treaty began in September 2022, involving the 46 member states of the Council of Europe, as well as Argentina, Australia, Canada, Costa Rica, the Holy See, Israel, Japan, Mexico, Peru, the United States of America, and Uruguay, as well as the European Union. On 17 May 2024, the "Framework Convention on Artificial Intelligence and Human Rights, Democracy and the Rule of Law" was adopted. It was opened for signature on 5 September 2024. Although developed by a European organisation, the treaty is open for accession by states from other parts of the world. The first ten signatories were: Andorra, Georgia, Iceland, Norway, Moldova, San Marino, the United Kingdom, Israel, the United States, and the European Union. It is the first multinational treaty on AI. As of January 2026, 19 parties had signed it.

=== Czech Republic ===
The Czech Republic adopted a National AI Strategy in 2019 and updated it in 2024 with the National AI Strategy of the Czech Republic 2030. The updated strategy includes a provision to ensure effective legislation, to create codes of ethics for developers and users, to establish supervisory bodies and to promote the ethical use of AI.

=== European Union ===
The EU is one of the largest jurisdictions in the world and plays an active role in the global regulation of digital technology through the GDPR, Digital Services Act, and the Digital Markets Act. For AI in particular, the Artificial intelligence Act was regarded as the most far-reaching regulation of AI worldwide in 2023.

Most European Union (EU) countries have their own national strategies towards regulating AI, but these are largely convergent. The European Union is guided by a European Strategy on Artificial Intelligence, supported by a High-Level Expert Group on Artificial Intelligence. In April 2019, the European Commission published its Ethics Guidelines for Trustworthy Artificial Intelligence (AI), following this with its Policy and investment recommendations for trustworthy Artificial Intelligence in June 2019. The EU Commission's High Level Expert Group on Artificial Intelligence carries out work on Trustworthy AI, and the commission has issued reports on the Safety and Liability Aspects of AI and on the Ethics of Automated Vehicles. In 2020. the EU Commission sought views on a proposal for AI specific legislation, and that process is ongoing.

On February 2, 2020, the European Commission published its White Paper on Artificial Intelligence – A European approach to excellence and trust. The White Paper consists of two main building blocks, an 'ecosystem of excellence' and a 'ecosystem of trust'. The 'ecosystem of trust' outlines the EU's approach for a regulatory framework for AI. In its proposed approach, the Commission distinguishes AI applications based on whether they are 'high-risk' or not. Only high-risk AI applications should be in the scope of a future EU regulatory framework. An AI application is considered high-risk if it operates in a risky sector (such as healthcare, transport or energy) and is "used in such a manner that significant risks are likely to arise". For high-risk AI applications, the requirements are mainly about the : "training data", "data and record-keeping", "information to be provided", "robustness and accuracy", and "human oversight". The NIST AI RMF addresses oversight through its GOVERN function. ISO 37000 assigns ultimate accountability for organisational conduct to the governing body.

There are also requirements specific to certain usages such as remote biometric identification. AI applications that do not qualify as 'high-risk' could be governed by a voluntary labeling scheme. As regards compliance and enforcement, the Commission considers prior conformity assessments which could include "procedures for testing, inspection or certification" and/or "checks of the algorithms and of the data sets used in the development phase". A European governance structure on AI in the form of a framework for cooperation of national competent authorities could facilitate the implementation of the regulatory framework.

A January 2021 draft was leaked online on April 14, 2021, before the Commission presented their official "Proposal for a Regulation laying down harmonised rules on artificial intelligence" a week later. Shortly after, the Artificial Intelligence Act (also known as the AI Act) was formally proposed on this basis. This proposal includes a refinement of the 2020 risk-based approach with, this time, 4 risk categories: "minimal", "limited", "high" and "unacceptable". The proposal has been severely critiqued in the public debate. Academics have expressed concerns about various unclear elements in the proposal – such as the broad definition of what constitutes AI – and feared unintended legal implications, especially for vulnerable groups such as patients and migrants. The risk category "general-purpose AI" was added to the AI Act to account for versatile models like ChatGPT, which did not fit the application-based regulation framework. Unlike for other risk categories, general-purpose AI models can be regulated based on their capabilities, not just their uses. Weaker general-purpose AI models are subject transparency requirements, while those considered to pose "systemic risks" (notably those trained using computational capabilities exceeding 10^{25} FLOPS) must also undergo a thorough evaluation process. A subsequent version of the AI Act was finally adopted in May 2024. The AI Act will be progressively enforced. Recognition of emotions and real-time remote biometric identification will be prohibited, with some exemptions, such as for law enforcement.

The European Union's AI Act has created a regulatory framework with significant global implications. This legislation introduces a risk-based approach to categorizing AI systems, focusing on high-risk applications like healthcare, education, and public safety. It requires organizations to ensure transparency, data governance, and human oversight in their AI solutions. While this aims to foster ethical AI use, the stringent requirements could increase overhead and compliance costs, delaying certain AI designs and deployments.

Observers have expressed concerns about the multiplication of legislative proposals under the von der Leyen Commission. The speed of the legislative initiatives is partially led by political ambitions of the EU and could put at risk the digital rights of the European citizens, including rights to privacy, especially in the face of uncertain guarantees of data protection through cyber security. Among the stated guiding principles in the variety of legislative proposals in the area of AI under the von der Leyen Commission are the objectives of strategic autonomy and the concept of digital sovereignty. On May 29, 2024, the European Court of Auditors published a report stating that EU measures were not well coordinated with those of EU countries; that the monitoring of investments was not systematic; and that stronger governance was needed.

The EU's Artificial Intelligence Act (Regulation (EU) 2024/1689) entered into force on 1 August 2024, creating a risk-based legal framework for AI systems, including special provisions for general-purpose AI models enforceable by 2 August 2025. It classifies AI applications by risk level. Article 14 requires human oversight capabilities for high-risk AI systems. The Framework Convention on Artificial Intelligence was opened for signature on 5 September 2024 under the Council of Europe.

The EU Artificial Intelligence Act from 2024 is implemented in rolling stages rather than all at once. August 2, 2026 marks the date when the transparency rules under Article 50 officially apply and require enforcement. These rules include labeling certain content that was AI-generated and disclosure when users are interacting with AI chatbots and agents. Rollouts continue through 2027, reaching a final milestone on August 2, 2028, which includes regulation for high-risk AI in products.

=== Greece ===
In July 2026, Greece passed Law No. 5321/2026, establishing the national framework for implementing the EU AI Act. The legislation designates supervisory authorities, creates a public-sector AI registry and an AI Observatory, and introduces an AI regulatory sandbox.

=== G7 ===
On 30 October 2023, the Group of Seven (G7) nations adopted a set of eleven guiding principles relating to the design, development and deployment of advanced artificial intelligence systems. These principles form part of the Hiroshima Process, a framework aimed at ensuring that AI technologies are implemented responsibly across global markets. Alongside these principles, a voluntary Code of Conduct for AI developers was introduced to encourage transparency, accountability, and risk-mitigation in emerging AI models and platforms.

New guidelines also aim to establish a coordinated global effort towards the responsible development and use of advanced AI systems. While non-binding, the G7 governments encourage organizations to voluntarily adopt the guidelines, which emphasize a risk-based approach across the AI lifecycle—from pre-deployment risk assessment to post-deployment incident reporting and mitigation.

The AI Principles and Code of Conduct (AIP&CoC) also highlight the importance of AI system security, internal adversarial testing ('red teaming'), public transparency about capabilities and limitations, and governance procedures that include privacy safeguards and content authentication tools. The guidelines additionally promote AI innovation directed at solving global challenges such as climate change and public health, and call for advancing international technical standards.

Looking ahead, the G7 intends to further refine their principles and Code of Conduct in collaboration with other organizations like the OECD, GPAI, and broader stakeholders. Areas of broader development include clearer AI terminology (e.g., "advanced AI systems"), the setting of risk benchmarks, and mechanisms for cross-border information sharing on potential AI risks. Despite general alignment on AI safety, analysts have noted that differing regulatory philosophies—such as the EU's prescriptive AI Act versus the U.S.'s sector-specific approach—may challenge global regulatory harmonization.

=== Finland ===
Finland has appointed a working group to evaluate what national legislation is required by the EU Artificial intelligence Act, and to prepare a legislative proposal on its national implementation. The working group began its evaluation on April 29, 2024, and is expected to conclude by June 30, 2026.

In the first stage of national implementation, legislation defining the powers of the supervisory authorities and the system of administrative penalties was approved by the President of the Republic on 22 December 2025 and entered into force on 1 January 2026. Finland adopted a decentralised supervision model, dividing oversight among existing market surveillance authorities according to an AI system's purpose of use, with the Finnish Transport and Communications Agency (Traficom) acting as the single point of contact. A second stage, covering an AI regulatory sandbox and a national register for high-risk AI systems related to critical infrastructure, was expected to take effect around the Act's full application date of 2 August 2026.

=== Germany ===
In November 2020, DIN, DKE and the German Federal Ministry for Economic Affairs and Energy published the first edition of the "German Standardization Roadmap for Artificial Intelligence" (NRM KI) and presented it to the public at the Digital Summit of the Federal Government of Germany. NRM KI describes requirements to future regulations and standards in the context of AI. The implementation of the recommendations for action is intended to help to strengthen the German economy and science in the international competition in the field of artificial intelligence and create innovation-friendly conditions for this emerging technology. The first edition is a 200-page long document written by 300 experts. The second edition of the NRM KI was published to coincide with the German government's Digital Summit on December 9, 2022. DIN coordinated more than 570 participating experts from a wide range of fields from science, industry, civil society and the public sector. The second edition is a 450-page long document.

On the one hand, NRM KI covers the focus topics in terms of applications (e.g. medicine, mobility, energy & environment, financial services, industrial automation) and fundamental issues (e.g. AI classification, security, certifiability, socio-technical systems, ethics). On the other hand, it provides an overview of the central terms in the field of AI and its environment across a wide range of interest groups and information sources. In total, the document covers 116 standardisation needs and provides six central recommendations for action.

In the 2026 Global Index on Responsible AI, Germany was ranked 6th globally out of 135 countries, 6th in Europe, and 6th among high-income countries.

=== India ===
IndiaAI was established in 2024, and an IndiaAI Safety Institute the following year.

The Information Technology (Intermediary Guidelines and Digital Media Ethics Code) Rules, 2021 were amended by a notification given on February 10, 2026 (G.S.R. 120(E)). The amendments introduce intermediary regulations for AI or synthetically generated content. Although India still does not have a binding standalone AI law, the amendments came into force on February 20, 2026, outlining new rules for synthetically generated content and information. These cover unlawful content, synthetically generated content labeling with permanently embedded metadata where possible, and changes to content removal responses. Although this is an amended framework for dealing with AI-based content, it also stipulates obligations that intermediaries must follow or risk changes in legal protections.

In the 2026 Global Index on Responsible AI, India was ranked 46th globally out of 135 countries, 9th in Asia-Pacific, and 3rd among lower-middle-income countries.

=== Israel ===
On October 30, 2022, pursuant to government resolution 212 of August 2021, the Israeli Ministry of Innovation, Science and Technology released its "Principles of Policy, Regulation and Ethics in AI" white paper for public consultation. By December 2023, the Ministry of Innovation and the Ministry of Justice published a joint AI regulation and ethics policy paper, outlining several AI ethical principles and a set of recommendations including opting for sector-based regulation, a risk-based approach, preference for "soft" regulatory tools such as AI sandboxes and maintaining consistency with existing global regulatory approaches to AI.

In December 2023, Israel unveiled its first comprehensive national AI policy, which was jointly developed through a collaboration between ministers and stakeholders. In general, the new policy outlines ethical principles aligned with current OECD guidelines and recommends a sector-based, risk-driven regulatory framework, which focuses on areas like transparency and accountability. The policy proposes the creation of a national AI Policy Coordination Center to support regulators and further develop the tools necessary for responsible AI deployment. In addition to domestic policy development, alongside 56 other nations, Israel signed in March 2024 the world's first binding international treaty on artificial intelligence. This treaty, led by the Council of Europe and named the Framework Convention on Artificial Intelligence, has obliged signatories to ensure current AI systems uphold democratic values, human rights, and the rule of law.

=== Italy ===
In October 2023, the Italian privacy authority approved a regulation that provides three principles for therapeutic decisions taken by automated systems: transparency of decision-making processes, human supervision of automated decisions and algorithmic non-discrimination.

In March 2024, the President of the Italian Data Protection Authority reaffirmed the agency's readiness to implement the European Union's newly introduced Artificial Intelligence Act, praising the framework of institutional competence and independence. Italy has continued to develop guidance on AI applications through existing legal frameworks, including recent innovations in areas such as facial recognition for law enforcement, AI in healthcare, deepfakes, and smart assistants. The Italian government's National AI Strategy (2022–2024) emphasizes responsible innovation and outlines goals for talent development, public and private sector adoption, and regulatory clarity, particularly in coordination with EU-level initiatives. While Italy has not enacted standalone AI legislation, courts and regulators have begun interpreting existing laws to address transparency, non-discrimination, and human oversight in algorithmic decision-making.

In the 2026 Global Index on Responsible AI, Italy was ranked 2nd globally out of 135 countries, 2nd in Europe, and 2nd among high-income countries.

=== Morocco ===
In Morocco, a new legislative proposal has been put forward by a coalition of political parties in Parliament to establish the National Agency for Artificial Intelligence (AI). This agency is intended to regulate AI technologies, enhance collaboration with international entities in the field, and increase public awareness of both the possibilities and risks associated with AI.

In recent years, Morocco has made efforts to advance its use of artificial intelligence in the legal sector, particularly through AI tools that assist with judicial prediction and document analysis, helping to streamline case law research and support legal practitioners with more complex tasks. Alongside these efforts to establish a national AI agency, AI is being gradually introduced into legislative and judicial processes in Morocco, with ongoing discussions emphasizing the benefits as well as the potential risks of these technologies.

Generally speaking, Morocco's broader digital policy includes robust data governance measures including the 2009 Personal Data Protection Law and the 2020 Cybersecurity Law, which establish requirements in areas such as privacy, breach notification, and data localization. As of 2024, additional decrees have also expanded cybersecurity standards for cloud infrastructure and data audits within the nation. And while general data localization is not mandated, sensitive government and critical infrastructure data must be stored domestically. Oversight is led by the National Commission for the Protection of Personal Data (CNDP) and the General Directorate of Information Systems Security (DGSSI), though public enforcement actions in the country remain limited.

=== New Zealand ===
As of July 2023, no AI-specific legislation exists, but AI usage is regulated by existing laws, including the Privacy Act, the Human Rights Act, the Fair Trading Act and the Harmful Digital Communications Act.

In 2020, the New Zealand Government sponsored a World Economic Forum pilot project titled "Reimagining Regulation for the Age of AI", aimed at creating regulatory frameworks around AI. The same year, the Privacy Act was updated to regulate the use of New Zealanders' personal information in AI. In 2023, the Privacy Commissioner released guidance on using AI in accordance with information privacy principles. In February 2024, the Attorney-General and Technology Minister announced the formation of a Parliamentary cross-party AI caucus, and that framework for the Government's use of AI was being developed. She also announced that no extra regulation was planned at that stage.

=== Peru ===
Peru's AI regulatory framework is based on Law No. 31814 from 2023, which promotes using AI for the country's economic and social development. Its implementing regulation was approved through Supreme Decree No. 115-2025-PCM in 2025. The framework establishes safeguards for responsible use and adopts a risk-based approach, prohibiting harmful applications and imposing additional requirements on high-risk systems, particularly regarding transparency, data protection, human oversight and accountability. In addition, the regulation designates the Presidency of the Council of Ministers as the national technical authority for AI governance.

=== Philippines ===
In 2023, a bill was filed in the Philippine House of Representatives which proposed the establishment of the Artificial Intelligence Development Authority (AIDA) which would oversee the development and research of artificial intelligence. AIDA was also proposed to be a watchdog against crimes using AI.

The Commission on Elections has also considered in 2024 the ban of using AI and deepfake for campaigning. They look to implement regulations that would apply as early as for the 2025 general elections.

In the 2026 edition of the Global Index on Responsible AI (GIRAI), the Philippines was ranked 68th out of 135 countries

=== South Korea ===
In December 2024, South Korea passed the Act on the Development of Artificial Intelligence and Establishment of Trust (AI Basic Act). The act established legal grounds for creating a national AI control tower, an AI safety institute, and various other government initiatives for AI-related research, standardization and policies. As part of the AI Basic Act, businesses that develop and deploy generative AI are responsible for safety and transparency, including implementing risk assessments.

In July 2026, the Act on Promotion of Industrial Digital Transformation and Utilization of Artificial Intelligence (Act No. 21250) came into effect. The amendments to this Act require those who profit from industrial data to prevent loss, theft, alteration or damage to that data. If these obligations are violated intentionally or negligently, then those persons are held liable.

In the 2026 Global Index on Responsible AI, South Korea was ranked 37th globally out of 135 countries, 4th in Asia-Pacific, and 31st among high-income countries.

=== Spain ===
In 2018, the Spanish Ministry of Science, Innovation and Universities approved an R&D Strategy on Artificial Intelligence.

With the formation of the second government of Pedro Sánchez in January 2020, the areas related to new technologies that, since 2018, were in the Ministry of Economy, were strengthened. Thus, in 2020 the Secretariat of State for Digitalization and Artificial Intelligence (SEDIA) was created. From this higher body, following the recommendations made by the R&D Strategy on Artificial Intelligence of 2018, the National Artificial Intelligence Strategy (2020) was developed, which already provided for actions concerning the governance of artificial intelligence and the ethical standards that should govern its use. This project was also included within the Recovery, Transformation and Resilience Plan (2021).

During 2021, the Government revealed that these ideas would be developed through a new government agency, and the General State Budget for 2022 authorized its creation and allocated five million euros for its development.

The Council of Ministers, at its meeting on 13 September 2022, began the process for the election of the AESIA headquarters. 16 Spanish provinces presented candidatures, with the Government opting for A Coruña, which proposed the La Terraza building.

On 22 August 2023, the Government approved the internal regulations of the Agency. With this, Spain became the first European country with an agency dedicated to the supervision of AI, anticipating the entry into force of the future European Regulation on Artificial Intelligence, which establishes the need for Member States to have with a supervisory authority in this matter.

The agency officially launched its operations on 19 June 2024. In April 2025, it became the reinforcing body for Spain's new law against unlabeled AI-generated content.

=== Sweden ===
In February 2026, the Swedish government adopted the country's first comprehensive AI strategy, replacing a national orientation for AI that had been in place since 2018. The strategy sets the objective of placing Sweden among the ten leading AI nations globally and states, and that AI should be developed and used to advance societal benefit, sustainable development, competitiveness and innovation. It was prepared by the Ministry of Finance, with civil affairs minister Erik Slottner as responsible minister, and drew on the AI Commission's report Färdplan för Sverige (SOU 2025:12) and the national digitalisation strategy for 2025–2030.

The strategy emphasises regulatory simplification, advocating rules that are simple, predictable, technology-neutral and fit for purpose, and states that Sweden will work within the EU to ensure that AI legislation does not impede innovation. It supports the use of regulatory sandboxes as controlled testing environments under the EU Artificial Intelligence Act (Regulation (EU) 2024/1689), and identifies improved data sharing within and between public authorities as a priority. Other stated priorities include public-sector adoption of AI, standardisation, computing infrastructure, research and skills provision, and the development of language models trained on Swedish and national minority languages to support digital sovereignty. The strategy also addresses AI in security and defence, including the risk of AI-generated disinformation, proposing media and information literacy as a countermeasure.

Implementation is to proceed through agency assignments, legislative changes, collaboration forums and budget measures, accompanied by an action plan setting out measures, timeframes and responsible actors. The Agency for Digital Government (Digg) and the Swedish Post and Telecom Authority (PTS) were tasked with supporting implementation, with annual follow-up linked to the digitalisation strategy and to the OECD review process. Related measures included a proposed law on interoperability requirements for data sharing in public administration (Prop. 2025/26:244) and the establishment of a shared public-sector AI infrastructure (AI-verkstad), with foundations laid in 2026 and full build-out planned for 2030.

=== Switzerland ===
Switzerland currently has no specific AI legislation, but on 12 February 2025, the Federal Council announced plans to ratify the Council of Europe's AI Convention and incorporate it into Swiss law. A draft bill and implementation plan are to be prepared by the end of 2026. The approach includes sector-specific regulation, limited cross-sector rules, such as data protection, and non-binding measures such as industry agreements. The goals are to support innovation, protect fundamental rights, and build public trust in AI.

=== United Arab Emirates ===
One of the United Arab Emirates’ (UAE) main AI regulatory documents is the 2024 UAE Charter for the Development and Use of Artificial Intelligence, issued by the Artificial Intelligence, Digital Economy and Remote Work Applications Office. The Charter establishes 12 guiding principles addressing human-machine relations, safety, algorithmic bias, data privacy, transparency, human oversight, accountability, technological excellence, human well-being, peaceful coexistence with AI, inclusive AI awareness, and compliance with applicable laws and international treaties. In 2026, the Office was incorporated into the Artificial Intelligence and Data Authority to strengthen and centralize national AI governance.

=== United Kingdom ===
The UK supported the application and development of AI in business via the Digital Economy Strategy 2015–2018 introduced at the beginning of 2015 by Innovate UK as part of the UK Digital Strategy. In the public sector, the Department for Digital, Culture, Media and Sport advised on data ethics and the Alan Turing Institute provided guidance on responsible design and implementation of AI systems. In terms of cyber security, in 2020 the National Cyber Security Centre has issued guidance on 'Intelligent Security Tools'. The following year, the UK published its 10-year National AI Strategy, which describes actions to assess long-term AI risks, including AGI-related catastrophic risks.

In March 2023, the UK released the white paper A pro-innovation approach to AI regulation. This white paper presents general AI principles, but leaves significant flexibility to existing regulators in how they adapt these principles to specific areas such as transport or financial markets. In November 2023, the UK hosted the first AI safety summit, with the prime minister Rishi Sunak aiming to position the UK as a leader in AI safety regulation. During the summit, the UK created an AI Safety Institute, as an evolution of the Frontier AI Taskforce led by Ian Hogarth. The institute was notably assigned the responsibility of advancing the safety evaluations of the world's most advanced AI models, also called frontier AI models.

The UK government indicated its reluctance to legislate early, arguing that it may reduce the sector's growth and that laws might be rendered obsolete by further technological progress. By 2026 however, the House of Lords has conducted a debate on the impact of artificial intelligence on human relationships and society. Archbishop of Canterbury Sarah Mullally (sitting with the Lords Spiritual) called for the Government and Parliament "to have backbone and regulate AI. There may be some who are worried about what that means for a US trade deal. My advice to Ministers is to put the future of our society, our cohesion and our children first." The House of Lords Library also prepared a report on documented effects of AI on mental health, healthcare, creative industries, and the environmental.

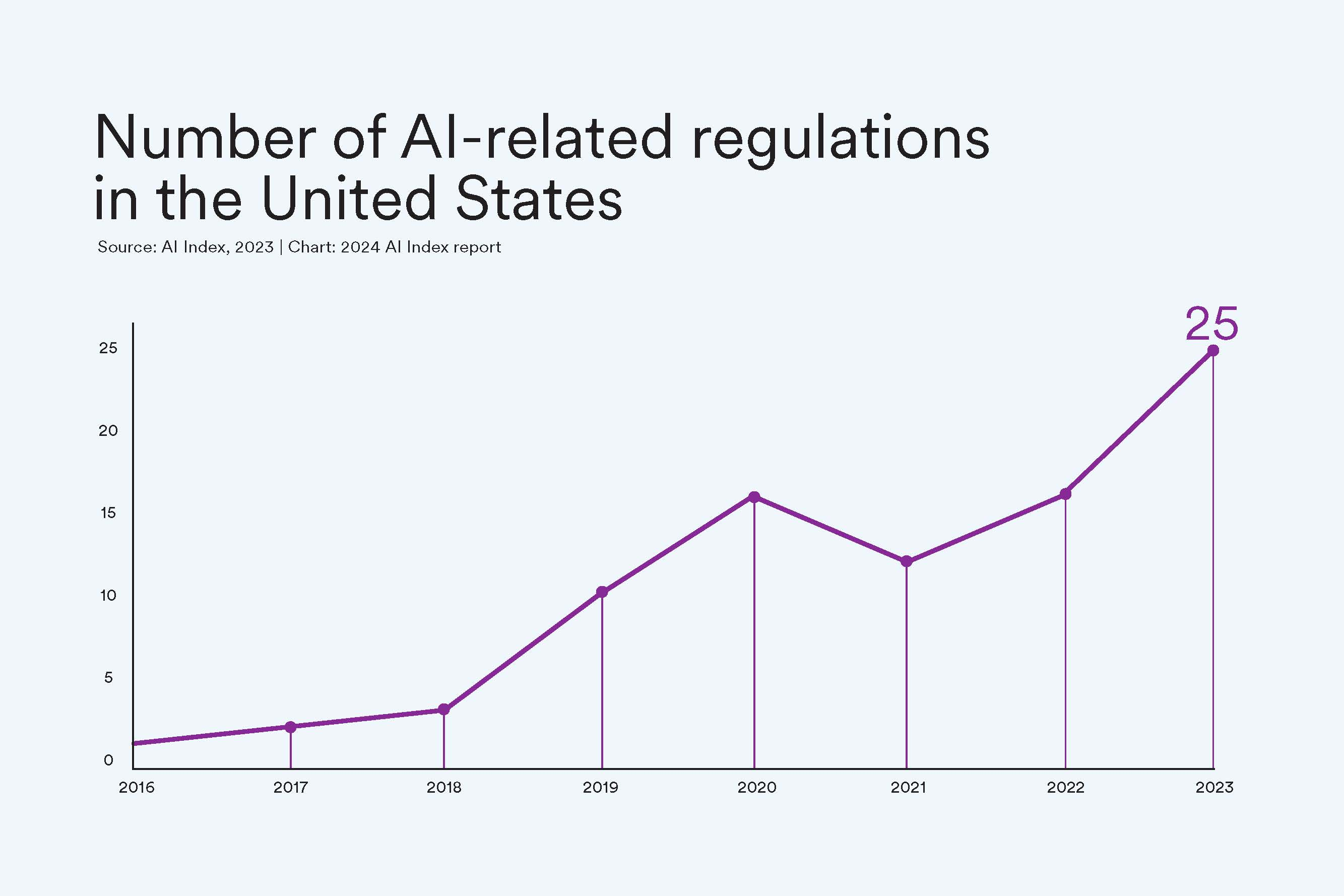

=== United States ===
Discussions on regulation of AI in the United States cover topics such as the timeliness of regulating AI, how to update regulations in the face of rapidly changing technology, the roles of state governments and courts, and the nature of the federal regulatory framework to govern and promote AI (what agency should lead and with what regulatory and governing powers).

In October 2023, the Executive Order 14110 presented federal requirements on the safety, security and trustworthiness of AI development and deployment. The order also requires individuals who develop the most capable AI systems to share any safety testing results with government agencies before releasing them to the public. It was revoked in January 2025 when Donald Trump became president.

On December 11, 2025, President Trump signed an executive order trying to preempt state AI laws. The executive order additionally directs federal agencies to develop a unified national approach to AI policy, evaluate state AI laws for potential conflicts, challenge them through legal action, and condition certain federal funding on state compliance, while exempting state laws related to child safety, data center infrastructure, and state government procurement. White House aide Will Scharf said that the executive order aims to "ensure that AI can operate within a single national framework in this country, as opposed to being subject to state level regulation that could potentially cripple the industry". Walter Donway, writing for a publication of the American Institute for Economic Research, criticized the order, saying, "The premise behind it is philosophically wrong: that a central authority can foresee the risks of an emergent technology better than the distributed knowledge of millions of actors operating within a free market. That premise was wrong when applied to railroads, radio, electricity, telephony, airlines, and nuclear power. It is even more disastrously wrong when applied to artificial intelligence."

Title VII of the Civil Rights Act of 1964 prohibits discrimination by covered employers on the basis of race, color, religion, sex, or national origin and requires employers to make reasonable accommodations for an applicant or employee whose religious belief, practice, or observance conflicts with a work requirement. With artificial intelligence entering workplaces, it is speculated that religious objections to it may require accommodation. James Paul, a labor and employment litigator, stated that he expects AI-related religious accommodation cases to "mushroom".

In 2026, as Trump dismissed concerns about the risks of AI as a "hoax" and a "scam," and federal regulation was stalled, leaders in multiple states pursued regulatory agendas. In September 2026, California governor Gavin Newsom signed an executive order to accelerate two recent AI safety laws, which might include development of a 'kill switch', laws that had been endorsed by AI firms Anthropic and OpenAI.

In October 2026, California signed the bill SB 574 to regulate how lawyers are allowed to use agentic AI. The requirements include that lawyers must personally verify cited material and review AI outputs to filter hallucinations.

=== South Africa ===
The Department of Communications and Digital Technologies (DCDT) published the Draft South Africa National Artificial Intelligence (AI) Policy 2026 on 10 April 2026 as the first step towards regulating the safe and secure adoption of AI technologies across all public and private sectors in the country. However, the policy was withdrawn following a scandal involving the inclusion of fake, AI-hallucinated citations in its reference list.

== See also ==
- AI alignment
- AI auditing
- Algorithmic accountability
- Algorithmic bias
- Artificial intelligence
- Artificial intelligence and elections
- Artificial intelligence arms race
- Artificial intelligence in government
- Artificial intelligence safety institute
- Ethics of artificial intelligence
- Government by algorithm
- Legal informatics
- Regulation of algorithms
- Robot tax
- Environmental impact of artificial intelligence
- Self-driving car liability § Artificial intelligence and liability
