= Hiroshima AI Process =

International initiative on AI governance

- Formation: May 2023
- Founder: Group of Seven
- Type: International policy initiative
- Purpose: Coordination of governance approaches for advanced and generative artificial intelligence
- Region served: Global
- Members: G7 member states and partners

The Hiroshima AI Process is an international initiative launched by the Group of Seven (G7) in 2023 to coordinate approaches to the governance of advanced and generative artificial intelligence. It was established at the 49th G7 summit in Hiroshima, Japan, as a forum for international discussion of risks, standards, and policy responses related to rapidly developing AI technologies.

The initiative has been described as part of a wider competition among major economies to shape global AI governance and harmonise regulatory approaches.

== Background ==
The Hiroshima AI Process was initiated amid increasing international concern about the rapid development of generative AI systems and the lack of coordinated global regulatory approaches. At the 2023 G7 summit in Hiroshima, leaders agreed to establish a ministerial-level process to examine governance challenges posed by advanced AI and to develop shared approaches to standards and risk management.

The initiative emerged alongside other international efforts focused on AI governance, including work associated with the Organisation for Economic Co-operation and Development (OECD) and policy initiatives in the European Union.

== Development and objectives ==
The Hiroshima AI Process functions as an ongoing framework for dialogue among G7 members and partners regarding the safe and trustworthy development of advanced AI systems. Policy analysts have described its aims as promoting international coordination, encouraging transparency, and developing shared governance principles for emerging AI technologies.

In October 2023, G7 leaders agreed on international guiding principles and a voluntary code of conduct for organisations developing advanced AI systems under the process.

== See also ==
- Regulation of artificial intelligence
