= Interim Measures for the Management of Anthropomorphic AI Interactive Services =

Proposed Chinese regulation on AI companion services

The Interim Measures for the Management of Anthropomorphic AI Interactive Services (Chinese: 人工智能拟人化互动服务管理暂行办法) is a document proposed by the Cyberspace Administration of China to regulate anthropomorphic artificial intelligence systems. The draft was released on December 27, 2025 for public comment period until January 25, 2026. The proposed document would prohibit AI companies and users of AI services from generating certain types of content deemed harmful to national interests or the social order, and impose various regulatory and safety requirements on providers of AI systems.

The proposed regulation is motivated by concerns about the psychological and social effects of AI systems that are perceived as personalities by their users, including addiction, encouragement of self-harm, or generation of illegal content.

== Description ==
=== Scope ===
The regulation would apply to AI systems that are offered to the general public within China. They would not apply to company-internal or research use, or to products that are only available outside of China. For the purpose of the regulation, anthropomorphic Ai systems are defined as those that "simulate human personality traits, modes of thinking, and communication styles, and that engage in emotional interaction with humans through text, images, audio, video, or other means".

=== Requirements ===
The regulation would require AI providers to monitor users for signs of harmful use and to take various interventions when indications of harmful use are detected. It would also prohibit AI systems from certain types of behaviors and generation of certain types of content. In some circumstances where a user appears to be at risk of self harm, the system would be required to hand over control to a human operator who would manually intervene. The regulation would also require more rigorous practices for managing the provenance of training data used to develop these systems, and would require explicit opt-in consent from users before their interactions with an AI system were used as training data. Data used to train the regulated systems would be required to reflect core socialist values and traditional Chinese culture.

== See also ==
- Interim Measures for the Management of Generative AI Services
- Regulation of artificial intelligence
- Artificial intelligence industry in China
- Artificial human companion
- Character.ai
