= Wombo =

Canadian lip-syncing deepfake creation app for mobile devices

WOMBO
- Other names: WOMBO.ai; W.ai; WOMBO.I
- Developers: Akshat Jagga, Angad Arneja, Ben-Zion Benkhin, Paul Pavel, Parshant Loungani, Vivek Bhakta
- Release: February 2021; 5 years ago
- Operating system: Android, iOS
- Type: Deepfake
- Website: wombo.ai w.ai

Wombo (stylized as WOMBO) is a Canadian tech startup centered around AI. Their flagship product is an app titled Dream, released in 2021, that has features such as using a provided selfie to create a deepfake of a person, text to image generation, and more.

== Company ==
Wombo was founded by Ben-Zion Benkhin. Based in Toronto, the company produces generative AI entertainment apps which have surpassed more than 200 million downloads as of 2024.

In March 2021, Wombo launched its first app, also called Wombo, which generated lip-sync videos from user selfies. The company also launched a text-to-image generator app called Wombo Dream in October 2021. In 2023, the company shut down its original app due to copyright issues, and they launched Wombo Meme, a tool for creating memes from selfies.

== WOMBO Dream ==
Dream is an image and video generation app powered by Stable Diffusion. It can be used to create images from text using a variety of style presets. It can also generate a deepfake using 5-10 images of source material.

The app includes a premium tier, which gives users priority processing time and no in-app ads.

Wombo processes images in the cloud. CEO Ben-Zion Benkhin says that all user data is deleted after 24 hours.

=== Development ===
Dream was developed in Canada and launched in February 2021 after a beta period in January. Wombo CEO Ben-Zion Benkhin says he got the idea for the app in August 2020. The app is available on both the App Store and Google Play Store.

=== Reception ===
Within its first three weeks of release, the app was downloaded over 20 million times, and over 100 million clips were created using the app. The sudden boom in deepfake technology has been described as "a cultural tipping point we aren't ready for", as it is now possible to create a deepfake from any picture off social media in a very short amount of time.

== WOMBO Me ==
Wombo Me is an avatar app that transforms a single selfie style photo into multiple life like images. It offers a range of avatar packs from professional headshots to imaginative renditions. This AI software from Wombo was designed more for fun, social sharing and personalization. The software's approach distinguishes it from other avatar apps that require multiple selfie style photos to generate images.
