= Interim Measures for the Management of Generative AI Services =

Chinese regulation introduced in 2023

The Interim Measures for the Management of Generative AI Services (Chinese: 生成式人工智能服务管理暂行办法; pinyin: Shēngchéng shì réngōng zhìnéng fúwù guǎnlǐ zànxíng bànfǎ) are a set of measures introduced by China to regulate public-facing generative artificial intelligence within the country. The measures took effect on 15 August 2023.

The measures were issued by the Cyberspace Administration of China, along with six other national regulators: the National Development and Reform Commission, the Ministry of Education, Ministry of Science and Technology, Ministry of Industry and Information Technology, Ministry of Public Security, and National Radio and Television Administration.

== Articles ==
=== Section 1: General provisions ===
Article 1 outlines the intention of the measures: promoting the healthy development and regulated usage of generative AI, while safeguarding national security, societal public interests, and the legal rights of citizens and organizations.

Article 2 defines the scope of the measures as applying to public-facing generative AI services within the People's Republic of China. It exempts internal services by companies, research institutions, and other organizations that do not provide services to the domestic public.

Article 3 sets out key principles that will guide the regulatory approach: equal emphasis on development and security, promoting innovation along with rule of law, and adopting inclusive prudence with classified supervision of generative AI services.

Article 4 requires generative AI services to adhere to relevant laws and respect social morality. Adhering to the Core Socialist Values, they must not generate content that promotes overthrowing the socialist system, harms national security, or undermines social stability. They must not promote discrimination, terrorism, extremism, violence, obscenity, or false and harmful information prohibited by law. Models should be designed and trained to avoid discrimination or algorithmic bias. Services should respect intellectual property rights and business ethics. They must respect others' rights and avoid endangering the physical and mental health of others. Effective measures should be taken to improve the transparency and accuracy of generative AI services.

=== Section 2: Technology development and governance ===
Article 5 encourages innovative application of generative AI across industries to create positive, healthy and high-quality content. It supports collaboration on AI innovation, data and application development.

Article 6 promotes independent innovation in core AI technologies, infrastructure development, and data resource platforms. It encourages international cooperation, collaborative sharing of compute, expanding high-quality public training data sources, and the adoption of secure chips and resources.

Article 7 mandates that providers employ effective measures to ensure that training data is high-quality, accurate, diverse, and legitimately sourced in a way that does not infringe upon intellectual property rights. If personal information is used, the users must provide consent.

Article 8 requires providers to formulate clear, specific and operable data labeling rules in line with the measures. It mandates quality assessment, sampling verification, personnel training and supervision for labeling work.

=== Section 3: Service specifications ===
Article 9 legally establishes providers as producers of online content and processors of personal data. Providers should sign service agreements with users to define rights and obligations.

Article 10 mandates taking effective measures from excessive use by minors. Providers should clarify the appropriate use of their services to users and help users understand generative AI.

Article 11 obligates providers to protect user privacy, minimize data collection and retention of personal information, and avoid illegally giving user information to others. Providers should accept user requests to review, copy, modify, or delete their personal information.

Article 12 requires labeling synthesized pictures, videos and other generated content.

Article 13 requires stable and continuous services for normal usage by users.

Article 14 obligates providers to promptly address when a service generates illegal content or if it is used by users to engage in illegal activities. This may include halting generation, retraining a model, warning users, and reporting to a relevant authority.

Article 15 mandates complaint and reporting mechanisms for public grievances with timely processing and feedback.

=== Section 4: Supervision, inspection, and legal liability ===
Article 16 gives regulatory oversight roles to cybersecurity, technology, industry, education, public security and other relevant government bodies.

Article 17 requires security assessments for services with public opinion influence, along with algorithm filing procedures.

Article 18 allows users to complain to authorities about non-compliant services.

Article 19 enables inspections of providers by officials, requiring cooperation and transparency.

Article 20 allows the government to address foreign services that violate the measures.

Article 21 defines the relevant authorities that may punish providers that violate the provisions. Crimes will be investigated according to law.

=== Section 5: Supplementary provisions ===
Article 22 defines key terms such as generative AI, service providers, and service users.

Article 23 requires obtaining relevant licenses to provide services where required by law.

Article 24 establishes that the measures take effect on 15 August 2023.

== See also ==
- Interim Measures for the Management of Anthropomorphic AI Interactive Services
