= P(doom) =

Probability of existentially catastrophic outcomes in AI

In the AI safety field, P(doom) is the probability of existentially catastrophic outcomes (so-called "doomsday scenarios") as a result of artificial intelligence. The exact outcomes in question differ from one prediction to another, but generally allude to the existential risk from artificial intelligence. Economic analyses show that even small existential risks due to AI would justify substantial investments in AI safety and alignment research.

The term was initially used as a shorthand for communication in the rationalist community (presumably first used by programmer Tim Tyler in a 2009 comment on LessWrong) and among AI researchers. It came to prominence in 2023 following the release of GPT-4, as high-profile figures such as Geoffrey Hinton and Yoshua Bengio began to warn of the risks of AI. In a 2023 survey, AI researchers were asked to estimate the probability that future AI advancements could lead to human extinction or similarly severe and permanent disempowerment within the next 100 years. The mean value from the responses was 14.4%, with a median value of 5%.

Some have criticized the concept of P(doom), arguing that the term is ambiguous and can alienate general audiences from AI risk discussions. Points of ambiguity include what scenarios qualify as "doom", the time frame that the probability covers, and the conditions that are assumed.

== Notable P(doom) values ==
Name	Image	P(doom)	Date	Notes	Ref.
15	15	<1% (Note: Refers to “P(humans are extinct by 2100 due to AI)”, factoring in expected human intervention.)	2026-09-10	American computer scientist and software engineer, founder of 15.ai	
Scott Aaronson	Scott Aaronson	5-50% (Note: "Depending on the definition of doom." Accounts for "all kinds of scenarios where humans doom themselves" where AI plays a "causal role".)	2026-10-27	American theoretical computer scientist and Schlumberger Centennial Chair of Computer Science at the University of Texas at Austin	
Sam Altman	Sam Altman	>0% (Note: "Big enough to take seriously.")	2025-10-01	CEO of OpenAI	
Dario Amodei	Dario Amodei	10-25%	2025-09-17	CEO of Anthropic	
Marc Andreessen	Marc Andreessen	0%	2024-06-19	Co-founder of venture capital firm Andreessen Horowitz	
Yoshua Bengio	Yoshua Bengio	20% (Note: "Professor Bengio shared his p(doom), saying: "I got around, like, 20 per cent probability that it turns out catastrophic." Professor Bengio arrived at the figure based on several inputs, including a 50 per cent probability that AI would reach human-level capabilities within a decade, and a greater than 50 per cent likelihood that AI or humans themselves would turn the technology against humanity at scale.")	2023-07-15	Computer scientist, director of the Mila institute, and the Turing award winner	
Grady Booch	Grady Booch	c. 0% (Note: Equivalent to "P(all the oxygen in my room spontaneously moving to a corner thereby suffocating me)".)	2023-12-07	American software engineer	
Vitalik Buterin	Vitalik Buterin	12%	2025-08-12	Co-founder of Ethereum	
Paul Christiano	Paul Christiano	50% (Note: c. 50% that "humanity has somehow irreversibly messed up our future within 10 years of building powerful AI". c. 20% each for human extinction and for AI takeover as a result of building powerful AI. (Partly overlapping.) Further details and probabilities are in "My views on 'doom'".)	2023-05-03	Former Head of research at the US AI Safety Institute	
Andrew Critch		85%	2024-11-15	Founder of the Center for Applied Rationality	
Destiny	Destiny	5%	2026-02-17	American live streamer and political commentator	
David Duvenaud		85%	2025-04-18	Canadian computer scientist specializing in probabilistic machine learning, generative AI, and AI safety. He is a CIFAR AI chair since 2021 and a Schwartz Reisman Chair in Technology and Society at the University of Toronto since 2024.	
Lex Fridman	Lex Fridman	10%	2025-06-05	American computer scientist and host of Lex Fridman Podcast	
Demis Hassabis	Demis Hassabis	>0% (Note: "Worth researching really carefully.")	2024-02-23	Co-founder and CEO of Google DeepMind and Isomorphic Labs and 2024 Nobel Prize laureate in Chemistry	
Dan Hendrycks	Dan Hendrycks	>80% (Note: Up from ~20% 2 years prior.)	2023-12-07	Director of Center for AI Safety	
Geoffrey Hinton	Geoffrey Hinton	10-20% (all-things-considered); >50% (independent impression)	2024-06-27	"Godfather of AI" and 2024 Nobel Prize laureate in Physics, University Professor emeritus at the University of Toronto	
Evan Hubinger		>10% (Note: Probability of human extinction "within the next decade" from 2026.)	2026-09-08	Alignment lead at Anthropic	
Geoffrey Irving		50% (Note: If artificial superintelligence is created. Value reflects Irving's personal uncertainty.)	2026-10-15	Computer Scientist worked at OpenAI, Google DeepMind, and the United Kingdom's AI Safety Institute	
Holden Karnofsky	Holden Karnofsky	10-90% (Note: Quote: "Even this 'easier' version of the question (conditional on a nearcast rather than a forecast) is far from easy. At the moment, the main thing I want to emphasize is that I don’t currently have much sympathy for someone who’s highly confident that AI takeover would or would not happen (that is, for anyone who thinks the odds of AI takeover in this nearcast are under 10% or over 90%).")	2022-08-29	Former Executive Director of Open Philanthropy	
Lina Khan	Lina Khan	c. 15%		Former chair of the Federal Trade Commission	
Daniel Kokotajlo		70–80%	2025-04-03	AI researcher and founder of AI Futures Project, formerly of OpenAI	
David Krueger		75%		American machine learning professor and advocate for the reduction of risks related to artificial intelligence.	
Connor Leahy	Connor Leahy	90%+	2024-11-22	German-American AI researcher; cofounder of EleutherAI.	
Yann LeCun	Yann LeCun	<0.01% (Note: "Less likely than an asteroid wiping us out".)	2024-04-07	Previously chief AI Scientist at Meta	
Shane Legg	Shane Legg	c. 5–50%	2025-05-23	Co-founder and Chief AGI Scientist of Google DeepMind	
Jan Leike		10–90%	2023-07-12	AI alignment researcher at Anthropic, formerly of DeepMind and OpenAI	
William MacAskill	William MacAskill	1-10%		Scottish philosopher and author of What We Owe the Future	
Benjamin Mann		0–10%	2025-07-22	Co-founder of Anthropic	
Emad Mostaque	Emad Mostaque	50%	2024-12-04	Co-founder of Stability AI	
Zvi Mowshowitz	Zvi Mowshowitz	70%	2025-09-06	Writer on artificial intelligence, director on the board of the Center for Applied Rationality, former competitive Magic: The Gathering player	
Elon Musk	Elon Musk	c. 10–30%		Businessman and CEO of X, Tesla, and SpaceX	
Casey Newton	Casey Newton	5%		American technology journalist	
Toby Ord	Toby Ord	10%	2023-10-08	Australian philosopher and author of The Precipice	
Kevin Roose	Kevin Roose	5-15%		American technology journalist	
Emmett Shear	Emmett Shear	5–50%		Co-founder of Twitch and former interim CEO of OpenAI	
Nate Silver	Nate Silver	5–10%	2025-01-27	Statistician, founder of FiveThirtyEight	
Max Tegmark	Max Tegmark	>90%	2025-04-30	Swedish-American physicist, machine learning researcher, and author, best known for theorising the mathematical universe hypothesis and co-founding the Future of Life Institute.	
Roman Yampolskiy	Roman Yampolskiy	99.9%–99.999999% (Note: Within the next 100 years.)		Latvian computer scientist, formerly a research advisor of the Machine Intelligence Research Institute, and an AI safety fellow of the Foresight Institute	
Eliezer Yudkowsky	Eliezer Yudkowsky	>95%		Founder of the Machine Intelligence Research Institute, author of If Anyone Builds It, Everyone Dies.	

== Criticism ==
P(doom) has been described as "unhelpful" as a meaningful measure of risk by academics and in news coverage, in part due to the lack of clarity about whether or not a given prediction is conditional on the existence of artificial general intelligence, the time frame, and the precise meaning of "doom". Instead, it has been proposed that use of the term should be interpreted as a social signal that one is a part of an in-group that has seriously considered the risks of AI.

== In popular culture ==
In 2024, Australian rock band King Gizzard & the Lizard Wizard launched their new label, named p(doom) Records.

== See also ==
- Existential risk from artificial general intelligence
- Statement on AI risk of extinction
- AI alignment
- AI takeover
- AI safety
- Future of Life Institute
- Survivalism
- Human extinction
- Global catastrophic risk
- Homo sapiens
- Neanderthal extinction
- Superintelligence ban
- Superintelligence: Paths, Dangers, Strategies
- Superintelligence
- Future of Humanity Institute
- Machine Intelligence Research Institute
- Artificial intelligence arms race
