= List of artificial intelligence institutions =

This is a list of artificial intelligence institutions, including independent, nonprofit, public, public-private, and government-backed research organizations focused on artificial intelligence, machine learning, AI safety, computer vision, natural language processing, robotics, and related fields.

This list generally excludes university departments and commercial artificial intelligence companies. For university-affiliated centers, see List of university artificial intelligence research centers. For commercial companies, see List of artificial intelligence companies.

== Artificial intelligence institutions ==
=== International ===
- Global Partnership on Artificial Intelligence
- International Joint Conference on Artificial Intelligence

=== Austria ===
- Austrian Research Institute for Artificial Intelligence

=== Canada ===
- Alberta Machine Intelligence Institute
- Mila
- Vector Institute

=== China ===
- Beijing Academy of Artificial Intelligence
- Beijing Institute for General Artificial Intelligence

=== Europe ===
- Confederation of Laboratories for Artificial Intelligence Research in Europe
- European Artificial Intelligence Office
- European Association for Artificial Intelligence
- European Laboratory for Learning and Intelligent Systems
- European Neural Network Society

=== Germany ===
- German Research Centre for Artificial Intelligence
- Innovation Park Artificial Intelligence
- LAION
- Max Planck Institute for Intelligent Systems

=== India ===
- Centre for Artificial Intelligence and Robotics
- Wadhwani Institute for Artificial Intelligence

=== Italy ===
- Italian Institute of Artificial Intelligence for Industry

=== Netherlands ===
- Innovation Center for Artificial Intelligence

=== Spain ===
- Spanish Agency for the Supervision of Artificial Intelligence

=== Switzerland ===
- Idiap Research Institute

=== United Arab Emirates ===
- Technology Innovation Institute

=== United Kingdom ===
- AI Security Institute
- Alan Turing Institute

=== United States ===
- AI Futures Project
- AI Now Institute
- Algorithmic Justice League
- Alignment Research Center
- Allen Institute for AI
- Americans for Responsible Innovation
- Association for the Advancement of Artificial Intelligence
- Center for AI Safety
- ControlAI
- Distributed Artificial Intelligence Research Institute
- EleutherAI
- Future of Life Institute
- Kestrel Institute
- Machine Intelligence Research Institute
- METR
- Partnership on AI
- Research Institute for Advanced Computer Science
- SRI Artificial Intelligence Center
- Windfall Trust

== See also ==
- Artificial intelligence
- AI-assisted algorithm discovery
- AI safety
- Artificial intelligence industry in China
- Comparison of deep learning software
- Comparison of machine learning software
- List of artificial intelligence projects
- Lists of open-source artificial intelligence software
