= ControlAI =

Non-profit organisation mitigating risks from advanced artificial intelligence

- Formation: October 2023; 3 years ago
- Founders: Andrea Miotti
- Type: Nonprofit
- Purpose: Advocacy to prevent extinction risk from artificial superintelligence
- Headquarters: London, UK
- Locations: Washington, D.C., United States; London, United Kingdom
- CEO: Andrea Miotti
- Key people: Connor Leahy
- Website: controlai.org

ControlAI is a non-profit organisation dedicated to preventing extinction risk from the development of artificial superintelligence (ASI). It was founded in 2023 by Andrea Miotti, who serves as its CEO. The organisation advocates for an international prohibition on the development of artificial superintelligence (ASI), while supporting continued development of narrower AI applications. The organisation's advisors include former UK Defence Secretary Des Browne, who is Vice Chair of the Nuclear Threat Initiative.

ControlAI operates across the United Kingdom, the United States, Canada and Germany.

== History ==
ControlAI was founded by Andrea Miotti in October 2023, in the run-up to the world's first AI Safety Summit at Bletchley Park. Miotti had previously been Head of Strategy and Governance at the AI safety company Conjecture. Beginning in the second half of 2025, the organisation expanded its policy outreach in the United States, Canada and Germany. In March 2026 Connor Leahy, the founder of EleutherAI and former CEO of Conjecture, was appointed US Executive Director.

=== Bletchley Park Summit and EU AI Act (2023) ===
Ahead of the November 2023 AI Safety Summit, ControlAI campaigned for binding regulation of advanced AI, arguing that the voluntary commitments under consideration were inadequate given the extinction-level risks publicly acknowledged by AI company leaders themselves, including Anthropic CEO Dario Amodei's estimate of a one-in-four chance of AI causing human extinction. Miotti was widely quoted on this in UK media including The Guardian, iNews, the Daily Mail, and The Sun.

During the final negotiations of the EU AI Act in late 2023, ControlAI campaigned against industry lobbying to remove foundation models from the regulation's scope, using mobile billboard vans in Paris and Brussels and commissioning YouGov polling that found more than two-thirds of respondents supported foundation model regulation. The final text retained dedicated rules for foundation models above a defined compute threshold.

=== Deepfakes campaign (2023–2024) ===
ControlAI ran one of the most visible UK civil-society campaigns against AI-generated deepfakes, building a cross-party group of more than 60 UK legislators who publicly endorsed banning deepfakes across the supply chain. The campaign was named explicitly in a motion of the Scottish Parliament in February 2024, and was covered by The Times and the Frankfurter Allgemeine Zeitung. In April 2024 the UK Government announced proposed legislation criminalising the creation of sexually explicit deepfakes. ControlAI is also a member of the international Campaign to Ban Deepfakes coalition.

=== "A Narrow Path" (2024) ===
In October 2024, Miotti and others published A Narrow Path, a policy plan proposing a phased set of domestic and international measures to prevent the development of superintelligent AI while preserving room for beneficial applications.

=== UK parliamentary campaign (2024–) ===
From late 2024, ControlAI ran a sustained briefing campaign with members of the UK Parliament; by early 2026 the organisation reported having briefed more than 150 cross-party parliamentarians and the UK Prime Minister's office. This work happened while the UK's AI policy was being criticized for delays and amid calls for the Secretary of State for Science, Innovation and Technology, Liz Kendall, to deliver stronger oversight. In December 2025, more than 100 of these parliamentarians had signed ControlAI's cross-party statement calling for binding regulation of the most powerful AI systems. Subsequent parliamentary activity went further, taking up ControlAI's broader call for an international prohibition on superintelligence development. In January 2026 the House of Lords held two debates on advanced AI risk, with Lord Hunt of Kings Heath (Labour) asking the Government about an international moratorium on superintelligence and Lord Fairfax of Cameron (Conservative) addressing risks from autonomous AI systems; both peers thanked ControlAI on the record for support in preparing their speeches. Labour MP Alex Sobel and Lord Hunt also published op-eds endorsing an international prohibition on superintelligence development. ControlAI has presented a draft AI bill prohibiting superintelligence at 10 Downing Street and in March 2026 advised on and backed an amendment to the UK's Cyber Security and Resilience Bill that would give the government powers to shut down datacentres hosting AI systems posing critical national security threats.

=== United States, Canada and Germany (2025–) ===
ControlAI has extended its policy outreach to multiple jurisdictions. In the United States, according to ControlAI, by 2026 it had briefed more than 100 Congressional offices, including 18 senators and House members. In Canada, ControlAI's Canadian representative Samuel Buteau briefed lawmakers and testified to the Standing Senate Committee on Human Rights, while CEO Andrea Miotti testified to the House of Commons Standing Committee on Access to Information, Privacy and Ethics. By early 2026, the organisation reported having briefed more than 200 lawmakers across the United Kingdom, United States, Canada and Germany.

The organisation has monitored and warned against the international race for artificial general intelligence, particularly between the United States and China. ControlAI has claimed potential risks associated with President Trump's Genesis Mission, an executive initiative aimed at deploying AI across the U.S. scientific ecosystem. The organisation warned that the mission could fail "if it becomes a mere subsidy for private companies building superintelligent AI that threatens national and global security".

== Reception ==
ControlAI's work has been covered by outlets including The Guardian, Time, Nature, The Times, Euronews, The Washington Post and Channel 4 News. Miotti has written op-eds for TIME, and The Spectator, and has given evidence to both the UK Parliament and the Canadian House of Commons.

The organisation's central claim that superintelligent AI poses an extinction-level risk is shared by researchers including Nobel laureate Geoffrey Hinton and Yoshua Bengio, as well as the CEOs of OpenAI, Anthropic, Google DeepMind and xAI, many of whom signed the 2023 Statement on AI Risk. The claim is disputed by others, including Gary Marcus, who argues that current AI systems are not on a clear path to superintelligence.

== See also ==
- AI safety
- AI alignment
- AI Safety Summit 2023
- Center for AI Safety
- Future of Life Institute
- Machine Intelligence Research Institute
- Pause Giant AI Experiments: An Open Letter
