= PauseAI =

Advocacy movement

- Formation: May 2023; 3 years ago
- Founder: Joep Meindertsma
- Founded at: Utrecht, Netherlands
- Type: Advocacy group, Nonprofit
- Region served: International
- Website: pauseai.info

PauseAI is a global political movement founded in the Netherlands with the stated aim of achieving global coordination to stop the development of more powerful general artificial intelligence systems, at least until it is known how to build them safely, and keep them under democratic control. The movement was established in Utrecht in May 2023 by software entrepreneur Joep Meindertsma.

== Proposal ==
PauseAI's stated goal is to "implement a temporary pause on the training of the most powerful general AI systems". Their website lists some proposed steps to achieve this goal:

- Set up an international AI safety agency, similar to the IAEA.
- Only allow training of general AI systems if their safety can be guaranteed.
- Only allow deployment of models after no dangerous capabilities are present.

== Background ==
During the late 2010s and early 2020s, a rapid improvement in the capabilities of artificial intelligence models known as the AI boom was underway, which included the release of large language model GPT-3, its more powerful successor GPT-4, and image generation models Midjourney and DALL-E. This led to an increased concern about the risks of advanced AI, causing the Future of Life Institute to release an open letter calling for "all AI labs to immediately pause for at least six months the training of AI systems more powerful than GPT-4". The letter was signed by thousands of AI researchers and industry CEOs such as Yoshua Bengio, Stuart Russell, and Elon Musk.

== History ==
Founder Joep Meindertsma first became worried about the existential risk from artificial intelligence after reading philosopher Nick Bostrom's 2014 book Superintelligence: Paths, Dangers, Strategies. He founded PauseAI in May 2023, putting his job as the CEO of a software firm on hold. Meindertsma claimed the rate of progress in AI alignment research is lagging behind the progress in AI capabilities, and said "there is a chance that we are facing extinction in a short frame of time". As such, he felt an urge to organise people to act.

PauseAI's first public action was to protest in front of Microsoft's Brussels lobbying office in May 2023 during an event on artificial intelligence. In November of the same year, they protested outside the inaugural AI Safety Summit at Bletchley Park. The Bletchley Declaration that was signed at the summit, which acknowledged the potential for catastrophic risks stemming from AI, was perceived by Meindertsma to be a small first step. But, he argued "binding international treaties" are needed. He mentioned the Montreal Protocol and treaties banning blinding laser weapons as examples of previous successful global agreements.

In February 2024, members of PauseAI gathered outside OpenAI's headquarters in San Francisco, in part due to OpenAI changing its usage policy that prohibited the use of its models for military purposes.

On 13 May 2024, protests were held across thirteen countries before the AI Seoul Summit, including the United States, the United Kingdom, Brazil, Germany, Australia, and Norway. Meindertserma said that those attending the summit "need to realize that they are the only ones who have the power to stop this race". Protesters in San Francisco held signs reading "When in doubt, pause", and "Quit your job at OpenAI. Trust your conscience".

== See also ==
- Regulation of artificial intelligence
- Pause Giant AI Experiments: An Open Letter
