= Bengio =

Bengio is a surname. Notable people with the surname include:

- Samy Bengio (born 1965), Canadian computer scientist
- Yoshua Bengio (born 1964), Canadian computer scientist
