= David Krueger (professor) =

American professor

David Krueger is an American machine learning professor and advocate for the reduction of risks related to artificial intelligence. Krueger is an assistant professor in Robust, Reasoning, and Responsible AI at the University of Montreal and a Core Academic Member at Mila.

== Early life and education ==
Krueger obtained a B.A. in mathematics from Reed College, and completed his MSc and Ph.D. in Computer Science at the University of Montreal. He trained in deep learning under Yoshua Bengio, Roland Memisevic, and Aaron Courville from 2013 to 2021. Krueger was also an intern on Google DeepMind's AI Safety team in 2018.

== Career ==
Krueger researches deep learning, AI alignment, and AI safety. His work is focused on reducing the risk of human extinction resulting from out-of-control AI systems. He also studies the risks of AI's recursive self-improvement.

Krueger was an assistant professor at the University of Cambridge from 2021 to 2024, before taking a faculty position at the University of Montreal in 2024. In 2023, he was a founding research director at the UK AI Security Institute. That same year, Krueger initiated the Statement on AI Risk, which argues that AI could cause human extinction and was signed by Anthropic's Dario Amodei, OpenAI's Sam Altman, AI expert Geoffrey Hinton, and other leaders.

In April 2026, Krueger discussed the risks of advanced AI at a Capitol Hill event hosted by Senator Bernie Sanders. He has also spoken out against rogue AI agents.

=== Evitable ===
In 2025, Krueger founded Evitable, a nonprofit organization that advocates for an AI moratorium.

== Views ==
Krueger argues that AI will lead to a "gradual disempowerment" of workers, likening AI chips to nuclear bombs. He also says the military use of AI "poses an existential risk to humanity."
