= Foutse Khomh =

Canadian computer scientist

- Education: University of Yaoundé I University of Montreal
- Known for: Research in software maintenance and evolution, machine learning systems engineering
- Awards: Canadian Academy of Engineering Fellowship, IEEE Senior Member, Arthur B. McDonald Fellowship
- Scientific career
- Fields: Software engineering, Machine learning
- Workplaces: Polytechnique Montréal, Mila, CIFAR
- Thesis: (2011)
- Doctoral advisor: Yann-Gaël Guéhéneuc

Foutse Khomh is a Canadian computer scientist and full professor of software engineering at Polytechnique Montréal, Canada Research Chair Tier 1 on Trustworthy Intelligent Software Systems, a Canada CIFAR AI Chair in Trustworthy Machine Learning Software Systems, and an FRQ-IVADO Research Chair in Software Quality Assurance for Machine Learning Applications. His research has contributed to the understanding of software maintenance and evolution, machine learning systems engineering, cloud engineering, and dependable and trustworthy ML/AI.

== Education ==
Khomh completed his Ph.D. in Software Engineering from the University of Montreal in 2011, where he was recognized for his doctoral research.

== Career ==
Khomh is a Full Professor in the Department of Computer Engineering and Software Engineering at Polytechnique Montreal and an academic member at Mila, the Quebec Artificial Intelligence (AI) Institute. As of January 2026, he serves as Vice-President, Research and Innovation at Polytechnique Montreal.. In 2023, he was appointed Scientific Co-Director of IVADO, in charge of scientific activities and international strategy. He has served as General co-chair and program co-chair for several international conferences and is a member of numerous editorial boards. His research focuses on software maintenance and evolution, machine learning systems engineering, cloud engineering, and dependable and trustworthy ML/AI.

== Awards and recognition ==
Khomh has been honored with several awards, including the Canadian Academy of Engineering Fellowship, the Arthur B. McDonald Fellowship, the Honoris Genius Prize - Engineering Research or Teaching from the Ordre des ingénieurs du Québec, the IEEE Computer Society TCSE New Directions Award alongside Prof. Lei Ma for "outstanding vision, leadership, and collaboration in establishing and advancing the field of trustworthy assurance for data-driven software systems", as well as several Best Paper and Most Influential Paper Awards from the IEEE Computer Society.
