= Geoffrey Irving =

Artificial intelligence safety researcher

- Education: Stanford University (PhD, 2007)
- Known for: AI Safety via Debate; Early RLHF for large language models
- Awards: TIME100 AI list
- Scientific career
- Fields: Computer science, AI safety, reinforcement learning from human feedback
- Workplaces: Google Brain; OpenAI; Google DeepMind; UK AI Safety Institute; Resolution
- Thesis: Methods for the Physically Based Simulation of Solids and Fluids (2007)

Geoffrey Irving is a computer scientist and AI safety researcher. His work includes research on scalable oversight, AI safety via debate, and early applications of reinforcement learning from human feedback (RLHF) to large language models. He has worked at OpenAI, Google DeepMind, and the United Kingdom's AI Safety Institute, and has been featured on the TIME100 AI list.

== Education and career ==
Irving received a PhD in computer science from Stanford University in 2007. His dissertation was titled Methods for the Physically Based Simulation of Solids and Fluids.

He has worked at Google Brain, OpenAI, and Google DeepMind. At DeepMind, he led the Scalable Alignment Team. In 2024, he joined the United Kingdom's AI Safety Institute, where he served as a research director and later as chief scientist.

In 2026, Irving became a co-founder and chief scientist of Resolution, an artificial intelligence alignment research organization.

== Research ==
Irving's work on scalable oversight includes AI Safety via Debate, a 2018 paper with Paul Christiano and Dario Amodei. The paper proposed using debates between AI systems to help a human judge evaluate answers to difficult questions. The debate approach has been discussed as a method for improving the honesty and oversight of advanced AI systems.

Irving was also a coauthor of Fine-Tuning Language Models from Human Preferences, a 2019 OpenAI paper that applied human-preference reward modeling to pretrained language models. The paper was an early contribution to reinforcement learning from human feedback (RLHF) for large language models.

With philosopher Amanda Askell, Irving wrote a 2019 article in Distill arguing that AI safety research should make greater use of empirical social science.
