= Kelly McKernan =

American artist (born 1986)

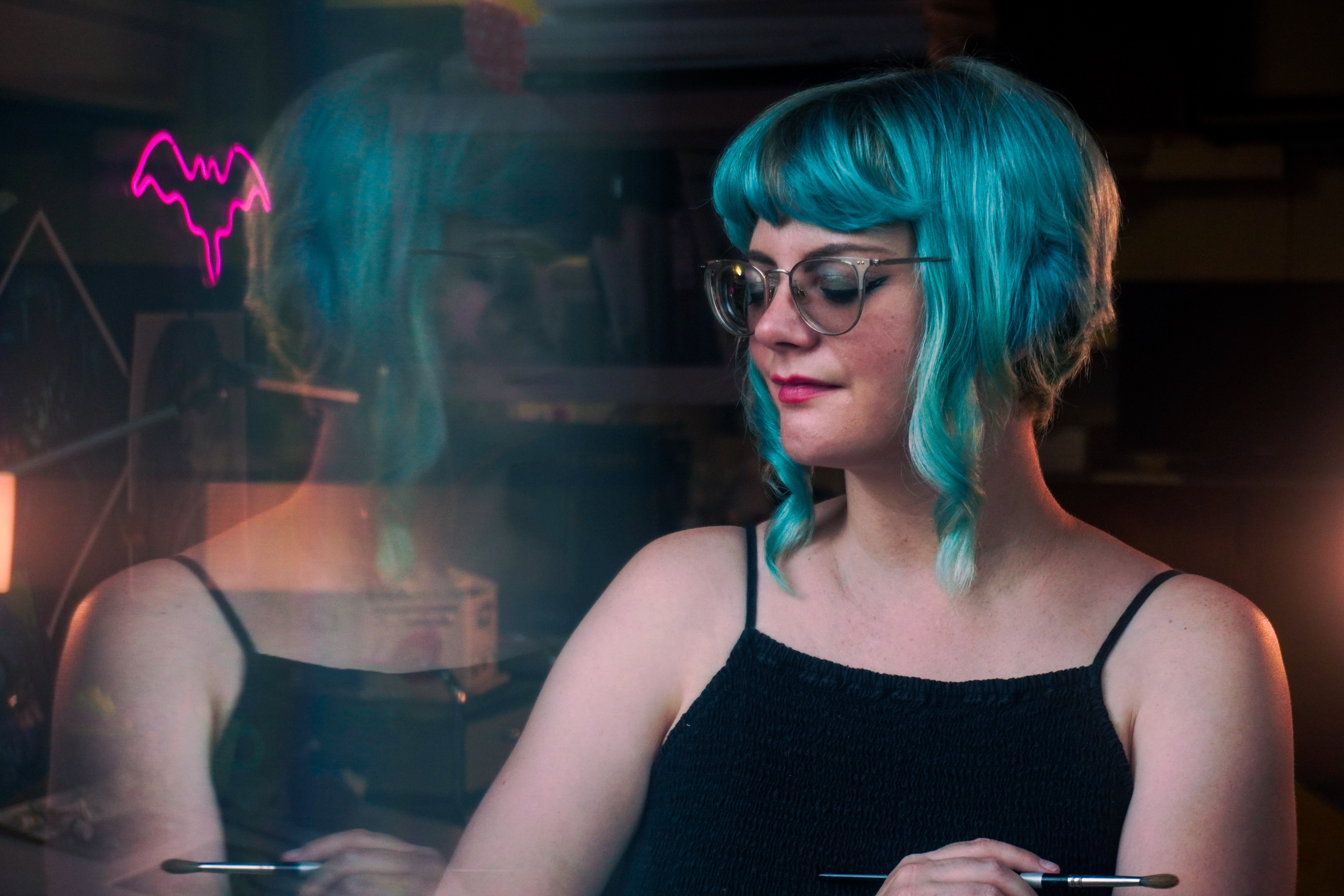
- Kelly McKernan in their studio, 2023
- Born: 1986 (age 39–40)
- Education: Kennesaw State University
- Website: www.kellymckernan.com

Kelly McKernan (born 1986) is an American artist based in Nashville, Tennessee.

== Early life and education ==
McKernan joined DeviantArt as a high school student in 2002. In 2009, they earned a Bachelor of Fine Arts from Kennesaw State University.

== Career and activism ==
McKernan teaches at the Nossi College of Art & Design in Nashville.

On January 13, 2023, McKernan, Sarah Andersen, and Karla Ortiz filed a copyright infringement lawsuit against Stability AI, Midjourney, and DeviantArt, claiming that the generative artificial intelligence tools used by the companies have infringed the rights of millions of artists by training on five billion images scraped from the web, without the consent of the original artists. On July 19, Judge William Orrick III stated he would dismiss most of the case, requesting they elaborate on issues and "provide more facts".

== Honors and recognition ==
In 2023, Time Magazine named McKernan to its list of Most Influential People in AI.

== Personal life ==
McKernan is nonbinary, and goes by they/them pronouns. They are a single parent.
