= Nya Dagbladet =

Swedish far-right online news site

- Home page in August 2023
- Type: Online newspaper
- Founded: 2012; 14 years ago
- Language: Swedish
- Country: Sweden
- Website: nyadagbladet.se

Nya Dagbladet (lit. 'New Daily Newspaper') is a Swedish online newspaper associated with the National Democrats, a defunct far-right political party in Sweden. It is known for promoting conspiracy theories, including Holocaust denial and white genocide, as well as anti-vaccine misinformation, alternative medicine and pro-Kremlin propaganda regarding the Russian invasion of Ukraine.

== History ==
Nya Dagbladet was established in 2012. Jonathan Leman, a senior researcher at the anti-racist Expo Foundation, said that Nya Dagbladet was an offshoot of the National Democrats, a far-right political party created by expelled members of the Sweden Democrats. Markus Andersson is its editor-in-chief.

In January 2023, Expo reported that the Future of Life Institute (FLI), a United States-based research institute, had offered a grant of $100,000 to a foundation set up by Nya Dagbladet. In response, FLI president Max Tegmark said that the institute had only become aware of Nya Dagbladet's positions during due diligence processes a few months after the grant was initially offered, and that the grant had been immediately revoked.

Nya Dagbladet has also created an English site, The Nordic Times, which translates its content from Swedish to English. To avoid the negative Swedish reputation they tried to separate the pages, but have the same staff and owner.

== Content ==
Expo has described Nya Dagbladet as "pro-Nazi". The paper promotes white supremacist and antisemitic content, including Holocaust denial, and has endorsed the neo-Nazi Nordic Resistance Movement. It also advocates for ethnopluralism, a concept in which ethnic groups are separated from one another. Nya Dagbladet has published favourable coverage of American white supremacist Jared Taylor, and has translated and published his writing.

Leman said in 2022 that Nya Dagbladet "has been a bridge between the conspiratorial milieu and the far right milieu". He said the paper "became a vital junction during the COVID-19 pandemic for conspiracy theories and anti-lockdown demonstrations, championing ideas from alternative medication and anti-vaccination to Holocaust denial and that ethnic diversity leads to white genocide" and added, "It has also been pro-Kremlin for years."

In January 2023, Nya Dagbladet published an article claiming that cardiac arrests among athletes had significantly increased following the rollout of the COVID-19 vaccines, citing what it called a study by cardiologist Peter A. McCullough and scientist Pangis Polekret. The fact-checking organisation Logically found that the supposed study was actually a letter to the editor, which cited a blog post by GoodSciencing as its source. GoodSciencing did not provide proof that the athletes had died due to complications caused by the vaccines.

=== Fake RAND report ===
In September 2022, Nya Dagbladet published a document it claimed was leaked from the RAND Corporation, a U.S.-based think tank. The report, which was supposedly published that January, claimed the U.S. planned the Russian invasion of Ukraine and the subsequent energy crisis to weaken Germany and divide Europe. Lead Stories noted that the document's content resembled statements by members of the far-right QAnon conspiracy theory movement. Nya Dagbladet's article was shared by Russian state media outlet RT and the Russian Embassy in Sweden on Twitter. RAND denied publishing such a report, stating that it was a fake.

Nya Dagbladet responded to RAND and Lead Stories's fact-check about the report by claiming they had not specifically addressed why the report was a fake. Logically noted that the report contained many issues indicating it was a fake, including multiple factual, spelling, grammatical and formatting errors, and several discrepancies with RAND's other published reports. In response to Logically's request for comment, Nya Dagbladet claimed to have never said the document was authentic, which contradicted its original article's headline: "Shocking Document: How the US planned the war and energy crisis in Europe".
