= Element AI =

Canadian software company

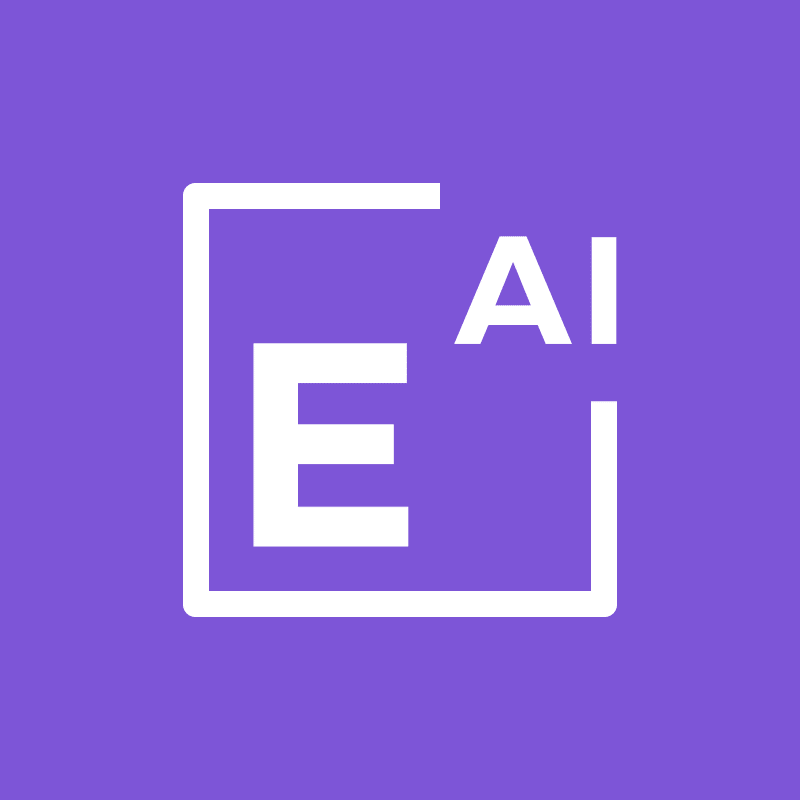
- Type: Private
- Industry: Artificial intelligence
- Founded: October 2016; 10 years ago
- Founders: Jean-François Gagné, Yoshua Bengio, Nicolas Chapados, Anne Martel, Philippe Beaudoin, Jean-Sébastien Cournoyer
- Headquarters: Montreal, Quebec, Canada
- Parent: ServiceNow
- Website: www.elementai.com

Element AI was a Canadian multinational artificial intelligence company based in Montreal, Quebec. It was funded by the Government of Canada for CAD$5 million, and raised US$102 million independently, before being acquired by ServiceNow. Prior to its acquisition, it had collaborated with Amnesty International, Twitter, Singapore Management University, the Port of Montreal, LG Electronics, Agile Data Solutions and others to release several studies.

== History ==
Element AI was founded in October 2016 by Jean-François Gagné and co-founders Yoshua Bengio, Anne Martel, Nicolas Chapados, and Philippe Beaudoin, along with Jean-Sébastien Cournoyer of Montreal venture capital fund Real Ventures. In early 2017, the company acquired the entire team of an open source machine learning database. It then raised US$102 million from US investors in a series A round led by the San Francisco venture fund Data Collective and Microsoft Ventures.

In December 2018, the Government of Canada gave a loan of up to CAD$5 million to Element AI with the goal of creating 900 new jobs. They later hosted a conference on the effects of AI, with Justin Trudeau and Mounir Mahjoubi establishing a global panel to study the effects of AI. In December 2018, Element AI also partnered with Amnesty International and released a study measuring online abuse against women in politics and journalism on Twitter.

Element AI had partnerships with GIC, Singapore Management University, the Port of Montreal, LG Electronics, among others. At the Port of Montreal, Element AI was working to predict how long trucks will wait to drop off or pick up goods at the port.

The company's first standalone product Underwriting Partner, an AI-assisted insurance underwriting workflow software, was released in September 2019. In December 2019, they released Knowledge Scout, a platform for data set management in manufacturing companies.

On November 30, 2020, ServiceNow, a Californian cloud-based IT services company, announced it had signed an agreement to acquire Element AI. The company was running out of money and options and sold for US $230 million. The acquisition was completed on January 8, 2021.
