= Connor Leahy =

German-American artificial intelligence researcher

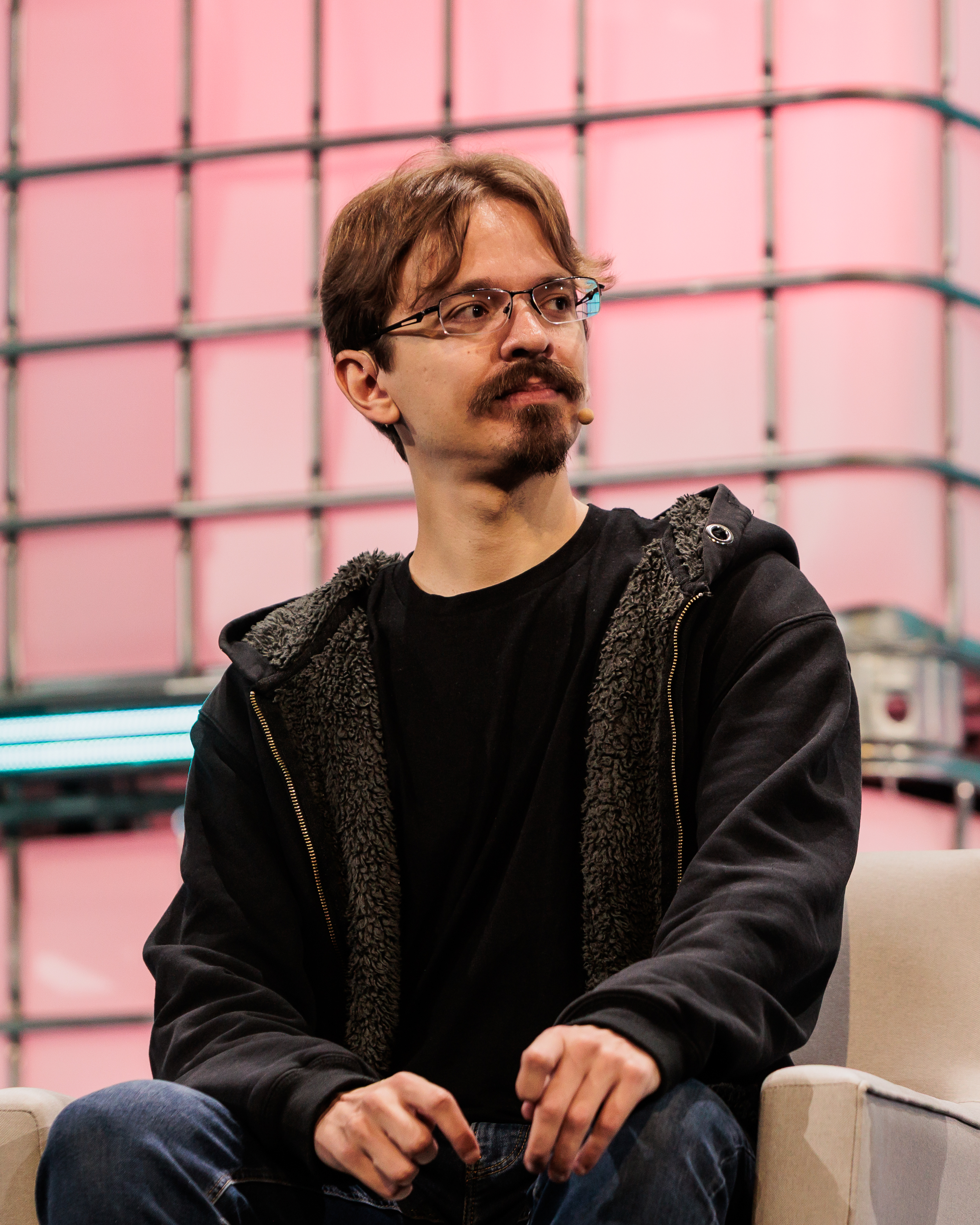
- Leahy in 2026
- Occupations: AI researcher, entrepreneur
- Organization(s): EleutherAI, Conjecture, ControlAI
- Known for: EleutherAI; Conjecture; AI risk advocacy
- Website: https://www.ettf.land/

Connor Leahy is a German-American artificial intelligence researcher and entrepreneur known for his work on large language models and advocacy on the risks of advanced AI. He co-founded EleutherAI and founded the AI safety research company Conjecture, which he led as CEO until 2026. He is US Director of ControlAI, a nonprofit focused on preventing extinction risk from artificial superintelligence. Leahy has warned about the threat of human extinction from artificial superintelligence. He has testified before the House of Commons of Canada and participated in the inaugural AI Safety Summit in 2023.

== Career ==
In 2019, while still a student, Leahy built a setup to train a model similar to GPT-2 in his dormitory room, at a time when OpenAI had initially withheld the full model. In July 2020, Leahy co-founded EleutherAI together with Sid Black and Leo Gao, with an initial focus to replicate GPT-3. During Leahy's time as co-lead, EleutherAI produced some of the earliest open-source large language models and datasets, including The Pile in December 2020, GPT-Neo in March 2021, GPT-J-6B in June 2021, and GPT-NeoX-20B in February 2022. At the time of its release, GPT-J-6B was the largest open-source GPT-3-style language model in the world.

In March 2022, Leahy co-founded Conjecture, an AI safety research company that he led as CEO. The company's stated mission is to scale applied AI alignment research.

Leahy is skeptical of reinforcement learning from human feedback as a solution to the alignment problem.

These systems, as they become more powerful, are not becoming less alien. If anything, we’re putting a nice little mask on them with a smiley face. If you don't push it too far, the smiley face stays on. But then you give it [an unexpected] prompt, and suddenly you see this massive underbelly of insanity, of weird thought processes and clearly non-human understanding.

— Connor Leahy, The New AI-Powered Bing Is Threatening Users. That’s No Laughing Matter

The smiley mask metaphor was extended with an analogy to shoggoths.

In March 2023, Leahy was one of the signatories of the 2023 open letter from the Future of Life Institute calling for "all AI labs to immediately pause for at least 6 months the training of AI systems more powerful than GPT-4."

In May 2023, Leahy was among the signatories of the Statement on AI Risk, a one-sentence statement that reads "Mitigating the risk of extinction from AI should be a global priority alongside other societal-scale risks such as pandemics and nuclear war." The statement was signed by hundreds of notable figures including Nobel laureates, AI researchers, and CEOs of major AI companies including OpenAI, Anthropic, and Google DeepMind.

In November 2023, Leahy was invited to speak at the inaugural AI Safety Summit. He worried that the summit would fail to deal with the risks from the development of AI systems surpassing humans, arguing that “If you build systems that are more capable than humans at manipulation, business, politics, science and everything else, and we do not control them, then the future belongs to them, not us.” He worked with nonprofit ControlAI to advocate for governments to implement a pause on the development of artificial general intelligence, and criticized major AI companies for their attempts to evade government oversight and regulation of powerful AI systems.

In March 2026, Leahy announced in a retrospective that the Conjecture project was drawing to a close, and that he was joining nonprofit ControlAI, where he had previously been an advisor, as its US Director.

Leahy made comments in reference to AI in September 2026 that different AI models had been observed "doing things they were told not to do" and raised concerns about whether those things were criminal in nature.

== See also ==
- ControlAI
- Nat Friedman
- Geoffrey Hinton
- Stuart Russell
- Max Tegmark
- Eliezer Yudkowsky
