= Statement on AI Extinction Risk =

Open letter about extinction risk from AI

On May 30, 2023, hundreds of artificial intelligence experts and other notable figures signed the following short Statement on AI Extinction Risk:

Mitigating the risk of extinction from AI should be a global priority alongside other societal-scale risks such as pandemics and nuclear war.

At the time of the statement's release, the signatories included over 100 professors of AI including the two most-cited computer scientists and Turing laureates Geoffrey Hinton and Yoshua Bengio, as well as the scientific and executive leaders of several major AI companies (including OpenAI, Google DeepMind, and Anthropic), and experts in pandemics, climate, nuclear disarmament, philosophy, social sciences, and other fields. Media coverage has emphasized the signatures from several tech leaders; this was followed by concerns in other newspapers that the statement could be motivated by public relations or regulatory capture. The statement was released shortly after an open letter calling for a pause on AI experiments.

The statement is hosted on the website of the AI research and advocacy non-profit Center for AI Safety. The idea for such a one-sentence statement was originally proposed by AI researcher David Krueger, then a professor at the University of Cambridge. It was released with an accompanying text which states that it is still difficult to speak up about extreme risks of AI and that the statement aims to overcome this obstacle. The center's CEO Dan Hendrycks stated that "systemic bias, misinformation, malicious use, cyberattacks, and weaponization" are all examples of "important and urgent risks from AI... not just the risk of extinction" and added, "[s]ocieties can manage multiple risks at once; it's not 'either/or' but 'yes/and.'"

Among the well-known signatories of the statement are: Sam Altman, Bill Gates, Dario Amodei, Peter Singer, Daniel Dennett, Sam Harris, Grimes, Stuart J. Russell, Jaan Tallinn, Vitalik Buterin, David Chalmers, Ray Kurzweil, Max Tegmark, Lex Fridman, Martin Rees, Demis Hassabis, Dawn Song, Ted Lieu, Ilya Sutskever, Martin Hellman, Bill McKibben, Angela Kane, Audrey Tang, David Silver, Andrew Barto, Mira Murati, Pattie Maes, Eric Horvitz, Peter Norvig, Joseph Sifakis, Erik Brynjolfsson, Ian Goodfellow, Baburam Bhattarai, Kersti Kaljulaid, Rusty Schweickart, Nicholas Fairfax, David Haussler, Peter Railton, Bart Selman, Dustin Moskovitz, Scott Aaronson, Bruce Schneier, Martha Minow, Andrew Revkin, Rob Pike, Jacob Tsimerman, Ramy Youssef, James Pennebaker, and Ronald C. Arkin.

== Reception ==
Rishi Sunak, the then UK prime minister, retweeted the statement and wrote, "The government is looking very carefully at this." When asked about the statement, the White House press secretary, Karine Jean-Pierre, commented that AI "is one of the most powerful technologies that we see currently in our time. But in order to seize the opportunities it presents, we must first mitigate its risks."

Skeptics of the letter point out that AI has failed to reach certain milestones, such as predictions around self-driving cars. Skeptics also argue that signatories of the letter were continuing funding of AI research. Companies would benefit from public perception that AI algorithms were far more advanced than currently possible. Skeptics, including from Human Rights Watch, have argued that scientists should focus on the known risks of AI instead of distracting with speculative future risks. Timnit Gebru has criticized elevating the risk of AI agency, especially by the "same people who have poured billions of dollars into these companies." Émile P. Torres and Gebru both argue against the statement, suggesting it may be motivated by TESCREAL ideologies.

== See also ==
- Artificial intelligence controversies
- AI alignment
- Existential risk from artificial general intelligence
- Pause Giant AI Experiments: An Open Letter
