= Distill (journal) =

- Discipline: Computer science
- Language: English
- Edited by: Shan Carter, Chris Olah, Arvind Satyanarayan

Publication details
- History: 2017–2021
- Frequency: Continuous
- Open access: Yes
- License: CC-BY 4.0

Standard abbreviations
- ISO 4: Distill

Indexing
- ISSN: 2476-0757
- LCCN: 2017201669
- OCLC no.: 972506987

Links
- Journal homepage

Distill was a peer-reviewed scientific journal covering machine learning. Articles could contain interactive graphics and so-called explorable explanations. The journal was established in March 2017 by Google, OpenAI, DeepMind, and Y Combinator Research. The editors-in-chief were Shan Carter (Google Brain), Chris Olah (OpenAI), and Arvind Satyanarayan (MIT Computer Science and Artificial Intelligence Laboratory). The journal was indexed in Ei Compendex. Its launch was criticized as overly hyped by The Scholarly Kitchen, which also noted that most authors were Google employees.
