= Stability AI =

British artificial intelligence company

Stability AI Ltd
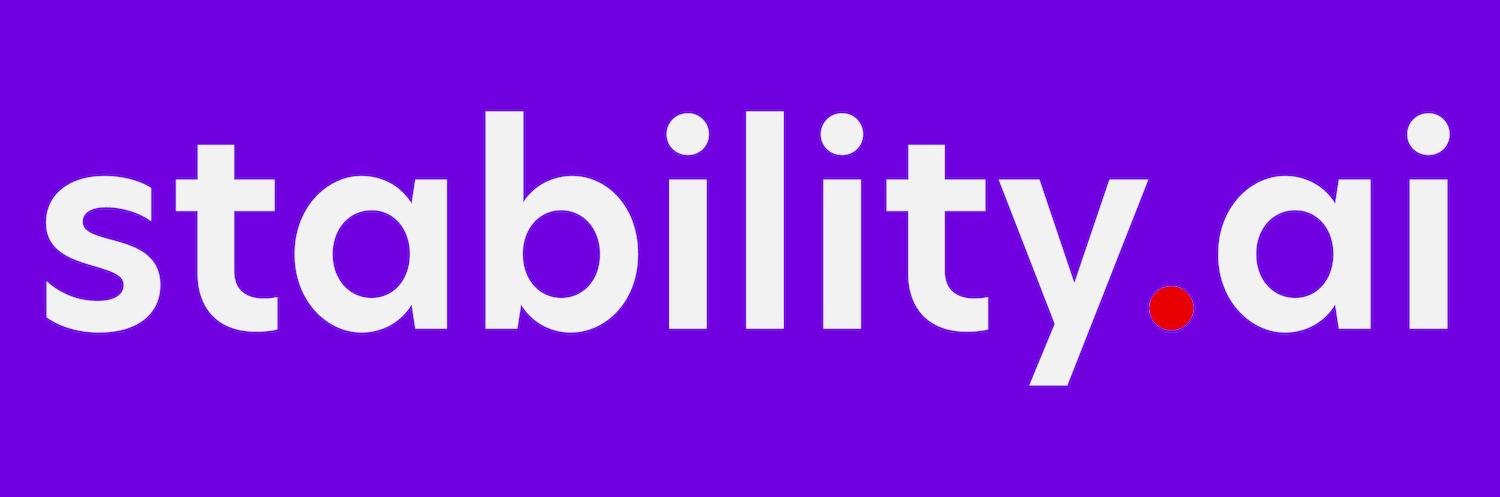
- Logo
- Type: Private
- Industry: Artificial intelligence
- Founded: 2019; 7 years ago
- Founders: Emad Mostaque; Cyrus Hodes
- Headquarters: London, England, UK
- Area served: Worldwide
- Products: Image: Stable Diffusion 3.5; Video: Stable Video Diffusion; Audio: Stable Audio 2.5; 3D: Stable TripoSR; Stable Point Aware 3D; Stable Fast 3D; Stable Video 3D; Stable Video 4D; Stable Zero 123; Text: Stable LM 2 Stable Code
- Number of employees: 170 (2024)
- Website: stability.ai

Stability AI Ltd is a UK-based artificial intelligence company, founded in 2019, best known for its text-to-image model Stable Diffusion and headquartered in London, England.

== History and founding ==
Stability AI was founded in 2019 by Emad Mostaque and Cyrus Hodes.

In August 2022 Stability AI rose to prominence with the release of its source and weights available text-to-image model Stable Diffusion. Stability AI had an office in Freiburg im Breisgau until Stability AI´s financial problems during 2023 caused employees to leave the company and found Black Forest Labs in 2024.

On March 23, 2024, Emad Mostaque stepped down from his position as CEO. The board of directors appointed COO, Shan Shan Wong, and CTO, Christian Laforte, as the interim co-CEOs of Stability AI.

On June 25, 2024, Prem Akkaraju, former CEO of visual effects company Weta Digital, was appointed CEO of the company.

== Funding and investors ==
In 2017 the company received a $101 million investment round led by Coatue and Lightspeed Venture Partners, with O’Shaughnessy Ventures LLC also participating.

On June 25, 2024, alongside announcing Prem Akkaraju as the new CEO, Stability AI also announced they had closed an initial round of investment from investor groups including Greycroft, Coatue Management, Lightspeed Venture Partners, and others. Sean Parker joined the Stability AI Board as Executive Chairman. On September 24, 2024, Stability AI announced that filmmaker James Cameron had joined its Board of Directors. It raised $76 million in Series B funding in 2026, with Universal Music Group, Sony Music Group, Warner Music Group, Electronic Arts, AMD Ventures, and Pacific Alliance Ventures taking part.

== Product and application ==
Stability AI offers the generative AI model Stable Diffusion which allows images to be generated from textual descriptions.

Stability AI also offers audio models. The company has worked with Arm Holdings to optimize its text-to-audio model, Stable Audio Open, for mobile devices running ARM processors.

== Litigation ==
In January 2023, artists Sarah Andersen, Kelly McKernan, and Karla Ortiz filed a lawsuit against Stability AI, Midjourney, and DeviantArt, alleging copyright infringement and other violations arising from the use of images collected from the internet. The litigation continued in 2026, with the court issuing further orders concerning discovery.

In July 2023, Stability AI co-founder Cyrus Hodes filed a lawsuit in the US District Court for the Northern District of California against CEO Emad Mostaque and the company, alleging fraud, misrepresentation, and breach of fiduciary duty. Hodes claimed that Mostaque deceived him into selling his 15% stake in the company for $100 in two transactions in October 2021 and May 2022, based on false representations that Stability AI was essentially worthless. Just three months after the final transaction, Stability AI raised $101 million in funding at a valuation of $1 billion. The lawsuit alleges that at current valuations, Hodes’ stake would be worth over $150 million. Hodes also accused Mostaque of embezzling company funds to pay for personal expenses, including rent for a lavish London apartment, luxury shopping sprees, and a $90,000 diamond ring purchased by Mostaque's wife using company funds.

Separately, Stability AI has faced legal challenges from Getty Images. Getty Images filed two lawsuits against the company, one in the High Court of England and Wales in London and another in the United States District Court for the District of Delaware. The lawsuit in Delaware alleged the company misused over 12 million photos from its collection to train its AI image-generation system, Stable Diffusion. This lawsuit, filed in Delaware federal court, is part of broader concerns about the use of copyrighted material in AI training datasets. Getty Images alleges that Stability AI copied these images without proper licensing to enhance Stable Diffusion’s ability to generate accurate depictions from user prompts. In November 2025, the High Court of England and Wales ruled that Stability AI was not guilty of copyright infringement despite using Getty Images as a training set for its image generator.

In a separate lawsuit filed in the United States in August 2025, Getty Images alleged that Stability AI had reproduced approximately 12 million images, together with captions and associated metadata, without authorization for use in training Stable Diffusion. In April 2026, a federal court allowed most of Getty's claims, including those involving copyright and trademark infringement, to proceed, while dismissing its claim concerning copyright-management information without prejudice. The case subsequently entered discovery.
