= Idiap Research Institute =

Research institute in Switzerland

Coordinates: 46.10906°N 7.08471°E

Idiap
- Founded: 1991
- Founders: City of Martigny; Canton of Valais; EPFL; University of Geneva; Swisscom
- Type: Foundation
- Location: Martigny, Switzerland
- Management: Interim Management team composed of Sébastien Marcel, Joël Dumoulin, Aïda El Faiz and Christophe Rossa
- Employees: approx. 180 (2025)
- Website: www.idiap.ch

The Idiap Research Institute (formerly Institut Dalle Molle d'Intelligence Artificielle Perceptive (IDIAP)), located in Martigny (Valais, Switzerland), is an autonomous, independent, non-profit research foundation with the mission of advancing research, innovation and education in artificial intelligence (AI).

In 1991, at the initiative of the Dalle Molle Foundation, the institute was co-founded by the municipality of Martigny, the Canton of Valais, the École Polytechnique Fédérale de Lausanne, the University of Geneva and Swisscom. The Idiap Research Institute is recognised by the governments of Valais and the Swiss Confederation, and is linked to EPFL through a strategic alliance. It is internationally recognised for its work in speech recognition, machine learning, computer vision and human–computer interaction.

Whereas it employed only around thirty people in 2001, Idiap had nearly 180 employees in 2025. Since August 2007, all staff have moved in the west wing of the Centre du Parc in Martigny.

For twelve years, from 2001 to 2013, Idiap also coordinated the National Centre of Competence in Research (NCCR) on Interactive Multimodal Information Management (IM)2.

In 2002, Idiap researchers Samy Bengio, Ronan Collobert and Johnny Mariéthoz developed Torch, a software library that was one of the forerunners of PyTorch.

In 2007, Idiap's first spin-off, Klewel, was founded. A few years later, two other Idiap spin-offs, KeyLemon and Recapp IT, developed technologies integrated into the Swisscom TV Box.

In 2011, the institute hosted the first edition of the Idiap Create Challenge (ICC), then called the International Create Challenge, a nine-day hackathon aimed at fostering entrepreneurship in the field of artificial intelligence.

In the following years, Idiap became the third biometric certification centre in the world, obtained Android accreditation, and took part in public events and exhibitions, while pursuing its three core missions: research, technology transfer and training.

In 2026, Idiap celebrated its 35th anniversary with an open day.

== Key points ==
- Recognition of Bin Laden's voice: the institute was asked by the television channel France 2 to determine whether audio recordings actually contained the terrorist's voice.
- Development of the benchmark software library Torch: Samy Bengio, Ronan Collobert and Johnny Mariéthoz, researchers at Idiap, published their work under the title "Torch: a modular machine learning software library". Released as open source, the tool became one of the standard references for developing artificial intelligence software. Taken up by Facebook, it later became PyTorch, which is used, for example, in self-driving cars.
- Speech recognition for Swiss German dialects: David Imseng developed a recognition system adapted to the dialects at Idiap and founded the company RecApp, whose solutions are used by several Swiss cantonal parliaments as well as by Swisscom.
- A robot learns to make raclette: Sylvain Calinon and Emmanuel Pignat used learning from demonstration to teach a robotic arm the cheese-scraping motion, illustrating the need to be able to program robots without coding skills. The demonstration was presented at CES in Las Vegas with the help of Nicolas Bideau.
- Launch of the exhibition Artificial Intelligence: Our Reflections in the Machine at the Musée de la Main in Lausanne, with support from the SNSF's Agora programme.
- Participation in the Foire du Valais with Drozbot, the portrait-drawing robot.

== See also ==
- Torch (machine learning) — created at Idiap Research Institute
