= Windfall Trust =

Non-profit organization studying economic effects of AI

- Formation: 2024
- Founders: Adrian Brown and Anna Yelizarova
- Website: windfalltrust.org

Windfall Trust is a nonprofit organization studying and forming policy responses to the economic effects of artificial intelligence. Its activities involve scenario-planning workshops for policymakers and economists, as well as research and policy proposals on AI's effects on labor markets and public finances.

The organization describes itself as a "policy accelerator" for the age of artificial intelligence in contrast to traditional think tanks. In 2026, the Wall Street Journal described the organization's scenario-planning exercises as part of Windfall Trust's role as "a nonprofit devoted to heading off AI's economic disruption by developing potential policy responses."

== History ==
Co-founder and chief executive Adrian Brown was the former founding executive director of the Centre for Public Impact.

Windfall Trust was originally incubated at the Future of Life Institute by co-founder Anna Yelizarova, and was spun out in 2024 to its own nonprofit.

== Activities ==
Among its activities include scenario-planning workshops that evaluate the economic effects of AI on jobs, incomes, and public finances, and to encourage countries to develop "economic preparedness plans".

The organization also maintains an online catalog, the Windfall Policy Atlas, of policy proposals related to economic disruption attributed to AI, organized into five domains: public and social investments; labor-market adaptation; wealth capture; regulation and market design; and global coordination. As of mid-2026 it contained 48 proposals, including sovereign wealth funds, wage insurance, and data compensation.

In September 2025 the organization held a scenario-planning workshop in San Francisco with top economists Erik Brynjolfsson, Ajay Agrawal, and Anton Korinek, attended by more than fifty economists. Later that year, a similar workshop was held with representatives from Google Deepmind, UK AI Security Institute, and OECD, among others.

=== 2026 ===
In February 2026, it co-convened a workshop in London with the academic Daniel Susskind on United Kingdom economic preparedness, with more than seventy economists, researchers, and civil servants. They were presented with a scenario ("Crossing the Threshold") set in October 2030 in which advanced AI displaces a large share of high-earning workers.

In March 2026, Windfall Trust published a survey conducted with the Collective Intelligence Project of more than 1,000 respondents in more than 60 countries. The organization reported that 72 percent of respondents said AI had a net positive effect on their lives, 60 percent said they personally knew someone who had lost a job to AI, and nine percent trusted their national government to distribute the economic gains from AI fairly.

In April 2026, the organization published "Mapping Tax Risks From Labour-Displacing AI", a working paper on the fiscal effects of AI-driven labor displacement and proposals to tax AI companies, which was cited by Bloomberg Law.

In August 2026, OpenAI selected Windfall Trust as one of fourteen recipients of grants in a program supporting independent research on AI-related economic policy.
