= Samy Bengio =

Canadian computer scientist (born 1965)

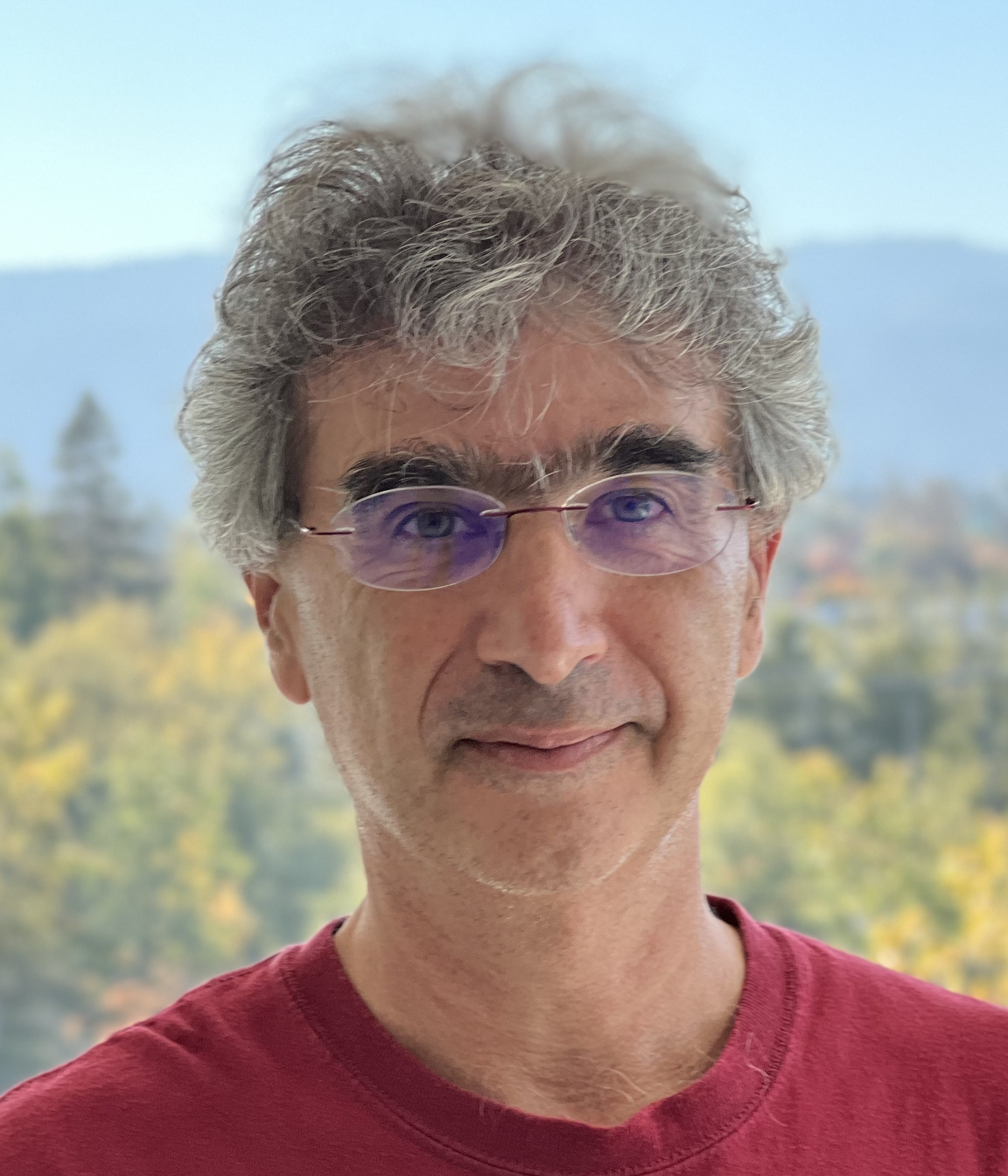
- Bengio in 2021
- Born: 1965 (age 60–61); Paris, France
- Education: Université de Montréal
- Relatives: Yoshua Bengio (brother)
- Scientific career
- Fields: Computer science
- Workplaces: Apple, Google, IDIAP Research Institute, Microcell Labs, EPFL
- Thesis: Optimisation d'une règle d'apprentissage pour réseaux de neurones artificiels (Optimization of a learning rule for artificial neural networks) (1993)
- Website: bengio.abracadoudou.com

Samy Bengio (born 1965) is a Canadian computer scientist working as senior director of Artificial Intelligence and Machine Learning Research at Apple.

== Education ==
Bengio obtained his Ph.D. in Computer Science in 1993 with a thesis titled Optimization of a Parametric Learning Rule for Neural Networks from the Université de Montréal. Before that, Bengio got an M.Sc. in Computer Science in 1989 with a thesis on Integration of Traditional and Intelligence Tutoring Systems from the same university, together with a B.Sc. in Computer Science in 1986.

== Scientific contributions ==
According to DBLP, Bengio has authored around 250 scientific papers on neural networks, machine learning, deep learning, statistics, computer vision and natural language processing. The most cited of these include some of the early works sparking the 2010s deep learning revolution by showing how to explore the many learned representations obtained through deep learning, one of the first deep learning approaches to image captioning, efforts to understand why deep learning works leading to many follow-up works. He also worked on the first evidence that adversarial examples can exist in the real world, i.e., one can change a physical object such that a machine learning system would be fooled and one of the first works on zero-shot recognition, i.e., recognizing classes never seen during training.

== Professional activities ==
Bengio is senior director of Artificial Intelligence and Machine Learning Research at Apple and an adjunct professor at École Polytechnique Fédérale de Lausanne. He was a longtime scientist at Google, where he led a large group of researchers working in machine learning, including adversarial settings. Bengio left Google shortly after the company fired Timnit Gebru without first notifying him. At the time, Bengio said that he had been "stunned" by what happened to Gebru.

Bengio worked at the IDIAP Research Institute and École Polytechnique Fédérale de Lausanne in Switzerland, from 1999 to 2007. He was appointed adjunct professor in Computer and Communication Sciences at EPFL in 2024.

He was general chair of the Conference on Neural Information Processing Systems in 2018, served as program chair of the conference in 2017, and is currently a board member. He was also program chair of ICLR (2015–2016) and sits on its board (2018–2020).

He is a co-author of Torch, the ancestor of PyTorch, one of today's two largest machine learning frameworks.

Bengio is an editor of the Journal of Machine Learning Research.

== Personal life ==
Samy Bengio was born to two Moroccan Jews who emigrated to France and Canada. His brother Yoshua is a Turing Award winner. Both of them lived in Morocco for a year during their father's military service there. His father, Carlo Bengio, was a pharmacist who wrote theatre pieces and ran a Sephardic theatrical troupe in Montreal that played Judeo-Arabic pieces. His mother, Célia Moreno, is also an artist who played in one of the major theatre scenes of Morocco that was run by Tayeb Seddiki in the 1970s.
