= Ian Goodfellow =

American computer scientist (born 1987)

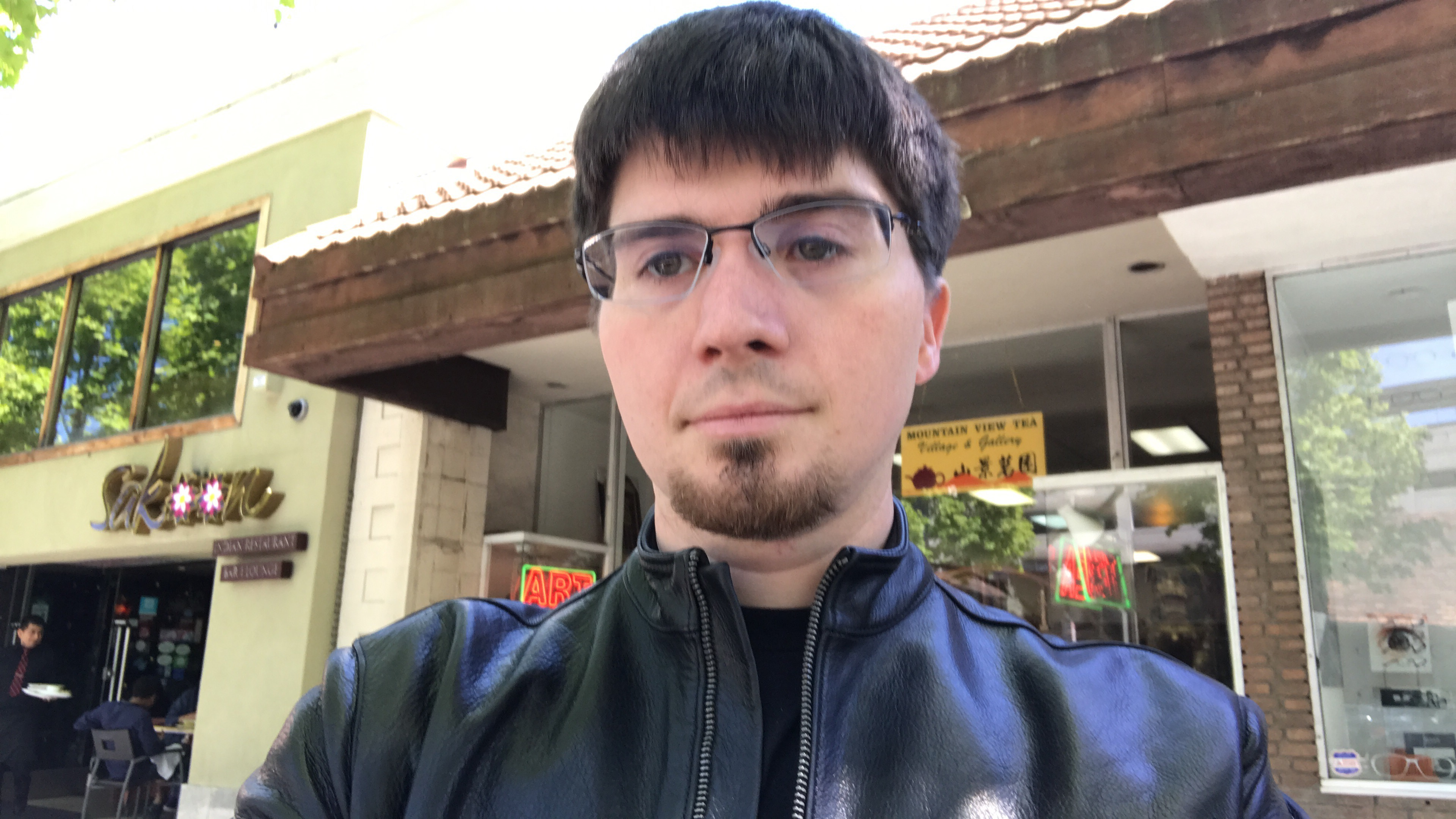
- Goodfellow in 2017
- Born: 1987 (age 38–39)
- Education: Stanford University (BS, MS); Université de Montréal (PhD)
- Known for: Generative adversarial networks, Adversarial examples
- Scientific career
- Fields: Computer science
- Workplaces: Apple Inc. Google Brain; OpenAI; DeepMind; Google DeepMind
- Thesis: Deep Learning of Representations and its Application to Computer Vision (2014)
- Doctoral advisor: Yoshua Bengio; Aaron Courville
- Website: www.iangoodfellow.com

Ian J. Goodfellow (born 1987) is an American computer scientist, engineer, and executive, most noted for his work on artificial neural networks and deep learning. He was a research scientist at Google DeepMind, was previously employed as a research scientist at Google Brain, and director of machine learning at Apple, as well as one of the first employees at OpenAI. He has made several important contributions to the field of deep learning, including the invention of the generative adversarial network (GAN). Goodfellow co-wrote, as the first author, the textbook Deep Learning (2016) and wrote the chapter on deep learning in the authoritative textbook of the field of artificial intelligence, Artificial Intelligence: A Modern Approach (used in more than 1,500 universities in 135 countries).

== Education ==
Goodfellow obtained his BSc and MSc in computer science from Stanford University under the supervision of Andrew Ng, and his PhD in machine learning from the Université de Montréal in February 2015, under the supervision of Yoshua Bengio and Aaron Courville. Goodfellow's thesis is titled Deep learning of representations and its application to computer vision.

== Career ==
After graduation, Goodfellow joined Google as part of the Google Brain research team. In March 2016, he left Google to join the newly founded OpenAI research laboratory. 11 months later, in March 2017, Goodfellow returned to Google Research, but left again in 2019.

In 2019, Goodfellow joined Apple as director of machine learning in the Special Projects Group. He resigned from Apple in April 2022 to protest Apple's plan to require in-person work for its employees. Shortly after, Goodfellow then joined Google DeepMind as a research scientist.

In 2025, Goodfellow left Google.

== Research ==
Goodfellow is best known for inventing generative adversarial networks (GANs), using deep learning to generate images. This approach uses two neural networks to competitively improve an image's quality. A “generator” network creates a synthetic image based on an initial set of images such as a collection of faces. A “discriminator” network tries to determine whether images are authentic or created by the generator. The generate-detect cycle is repeated. For each iteration, the generator and the discriminator use the other's feedback to improve or detect the generated images, until the discriminator can no longer distinguish between generated and authentic images. However, GANs have also been used to create deepfakes.

At Google, Goodfellow developed a system enabling Google Maps to automatically transcribe addresses from photos taken by Street View cars and demonstrated security vulnerabilities of machine learning systems.

== Recognition ==
In 2017, Goodfellow was cited in MIT Technology Review's 35 Innovators Under 35. In 2019, he was included in Foreign Policy's list of 100 Global Thinkers.
