= Emad Mostaque =

Bangladeshi-British businessman (born 1983)

- ইমাদ মোশতাক
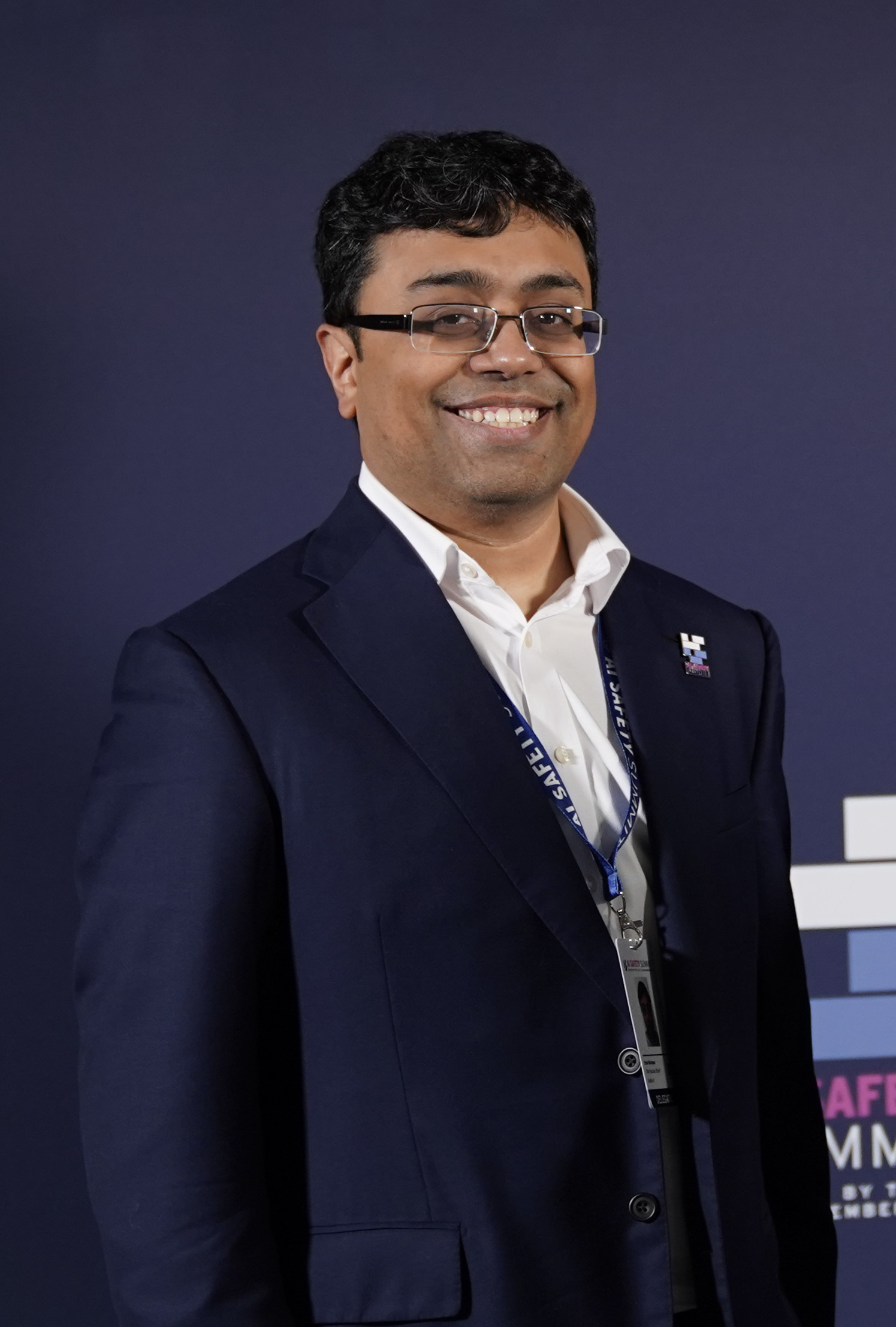
- Born: 17 April 1983 (age 43); Jordan
- Education: University of Oxford
- Occupations: Business executive Mathematician; Hedge fund manager
- Years active: 2005–present
- Known for: Funding AI projects
- Notable work: Stable Diffusion

Mohammad Emad Mostaque (Bengali: মোহম্মদ ইমাদ মোশতাক; born 17 April 1983) is a British-Bangladeshi businessman, mathematician, and former hedge fund manager. He is the founder of Intelligent Internet and the author of The Last Economy. He is the co-founder and was CEO of Stability AI until March 2024, the company behind Stable Diffusion.

== Early life ==
Mostaque was born in April 1983 to a Bengali Muslim family in Jordan. He was taken to Dhaka, Bangladesh, a month after his birth, and migrated with his family to the United Kingdom at the age of seven. He earned an MA in mathematics and computer science from the University of Oxford.

At age 19, Mostaque met his wife while on a student trip to the United States. He has been diagnosed with Asperger's and ADHD. In his twenties, he became interested in helping the Islamic world by creating online forums for Muslim communities and developing "Islamic AI" which would help guide people on their religious journey.

== Career ==
Mostaque began his career as a hedge fund manager who was involved in crude oil trading and providing advice to governments on Middle East affairs and Islamic extremism. During the COVID-19 pandemic, he and his co-founder Cyrus Hodes led an effort to use big data to assist in governmental decision-making. launched at Stanford University with the World Bank, UNESCO, World Health Organization and others.

In 2019 Mostaque founded Symmitree, a startup that aimed to reduce the cost of technology for individuals living in poverty, which he worked on for a year. The project failed, according to co-founder Cyrus Hodes, due to Mostaque's negligence, ineptitude and corruption. Mostaque said it was due to failed execution from the company's partners.

=== Stability AI ===
In late 2020, Emad Mostaque co-founded Stability AI with Cyrus Hodes. They initially self-funded the company, but later received investments from other companies. Stability AI's well-known AI image generator, Stable Diffusion, originated from a project called Latent Diffusion, developed by researchers at LMU Munich and Heidelberg University, led by Robin Rombach and Andreas Blattmann, assisted by Patrick Esser and Dominik Lorenz under their PhD advisor Björn Ommer. Stability AI offered computational resources to support the project, and the model was officially released in August 2022 under the name Stable Diffusion. Rombach, Blattmann, Esser and Lorenz subsequently joined Stability AI, leading the development of subsequent Stable Diffusion models. Rombach, Blattmann and Lorenz resigned in March 2024, as part of a "mass exodus of executives" that coincided with reported shrinking cash reserves as Stability AI struggled to raise funds.

On 23 March 2024 Mostaque resigned from his position as CEO of Stability AI, and from his seat on the company's board of directors. He stated he left the company to pursue decentralized AI initiatives, although several news reports state that Mostaque was driven out after months of pressure from disgruntled investors despite revenue reaching $5.4m monthly. In an October 2023 letter to Stability's board, investor Lightspeed Venture Partners said Mostaque's mismanagement had "severely undermined" its confidence in him and urged the company to search for a buyer. Another investor, Coatue, had been pushing for Mostaque to resign for months and launched an internal investigation into his management.

Stability appointed Shan Shan Wong, its former COO, and Christian Laforte, who had only recently risen to the level of CTO from his role as VP of research, as interim co-CEOs following Mostaque's departure. In a statement, Mostaque expressed pride in leading Stability AI to significant growth during his tenure, including achieving hundreds of millions of downloads and developing top-tier generative AI models across various domains. Mostaque emphasized his belief in Stability AI's mission and the importance of maintaining open and decentralized AI technologies.

New CEO Prem Akkaraju noted that the cash reserves of the company upon Mostaque's departures were more than the 90 days of runway.

== Controversy and allegations ==
In June 2023, a news report citing more than 30 sources, including investors and former Stability AI employees, stated that Mostaque had misled investors and the public about his educational background, a partnership with Amazon Web Services and the extent of his involvement in developing Stable Diffusion. The article also detailed Mostaque's unsubstantiated claims of partnerships with several NGOs, including the United Nations, and the government of Malawi. Mostaque subsequently addressed these claims in his personal blog. In the blog post, Mostaque said he partnered with these organizations in his work with the Collective and Augmented Intelligence Against COVID-19 (CAIAC), a project he founded with AI researcher Cyrus Hodes that failed to launch.

On 13 July 2023, Stability AI co-founder Cyrus Hodes filed a civil lawsuit against Mostaque, claiming he was defrauded into selling his 15% stake in the company for $100. The stake was valued at $150 million during a round of financing in October 2022, only five months after Hodes sold his shares. The company responded in a statement saying Hodes was suffering from "a clear case of seller's remorse" and Mostaque provided screenshots and his version of events on his personal Twitter account. The suit has yet to go to trial.

== Opinions ==
In 2022, Mostaque advocated for an open-source approach to AI. Some have supported this approach as this could lead to increased innovation and democratization of AI technology, while others have expressed concerns about the potential risks of releasing open-source AI models without adequate safeguards, citing possible regulatory backlash and negative societal consequences.

In March 2023, he signed Pause Giant AI Experiments: An Open Letter calling for "all AI labs to immediately pause for at least 6 months the training of AI systems more powerful than GPT-4".

In July 2023, he declared that generative AI "is a $1 trillion investment opportunity but will be 'biggest bubble of all time'".

== Personal life ==
Mostaque is married to Zehra Qureshi, who previously ran Stability AI's public relations and was a member of its board of directors. Qureshi stepped down from the board in January 2023 to focus on personal projects and family, though internal documents from May 2023 still listed her as "Head of Foundation."

They have two children.
