= Future of Life Institute =

International nonprofit research institute

Coordinates: 37.285476°N 121.944084°W

- Logo of the Future of Life Institute
- Abbreviation: FLI
- Formation: March 2014; 12 years ago
- Founders: Jaan Tallinn; Max Tegmark; Viktoriya Krakovna; Anthony Aguirre; Meia Chita-Tegmark
- Type: Non-profit research institute
- Purpose: Reduction of existential risk, particularly from advanced artificial intelligence
- Headquarters: Campbell, California, United States
- Locations: Global; Brussels, Belgium; Campbell, California, United States; London, United Kingdom; Washington, D.C., United States
- President: Max Tegmark
- Endowment: $665.8 million (in 2021)
- Website: futureoflife.org

The Future of Life Institute (FLI) is a nonprofit organization which advocates against large-scale risks from technology, with a focus on existential risk from artificial general intelligence (AI). FLI's work includes grantmaking, educational outreach, and advocacy within the United Nations, United States government, and European Union institutions.

The founders of the Institute include MIT cosmologist Max Tegmark, UCSC cosmologist Anthony Aguirre, and Skype co-founder Jaan Tallinn.

== Purpose ==
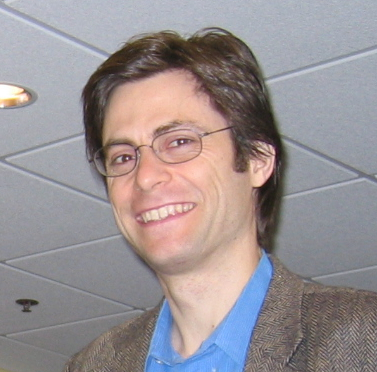
Max Tegmark, professor at MIT, one of the founders and current president of the Future of Life Institute

FLI's stated mission is to steer transformative technology towards benefiting life and away from large-scale risks. FLI focuses on the potential risk to humanity from the development of human-level or superintelligent artificial general intelligence (AGI), but also works to mitigate risk from biotechnology, nuclear weapons and global warming.

== History ==
=== Founding ===
FLI was founded in March 2014 by MIT cosmologist Max Tegmark, Skype co-founder Jaan Tallinn, DeepMind research scientist Viktoriya Krakovna, Tufts University postdoctoral scholar Meia Chita-Tegmark, and UCSC physicist Anthony Aguirre.

=== Activism ===
Starting in 2017, FLI has offered an annual "Future of Life Award", with the first awardee being Vasili Arkhipov. In the same year, FLI released Slaughterbots, a short arms-control advocacy film. FLI released a sequel in 2021, and another in 2025.

In 2018, FLI drafted a letter calling for "laws against lethal autonomous weapons". Signatories included Elon Musk, Demis Hassabis, Shane Legg, and Mustafa Suleyman.

In January 2023, Swedish magazine Expo reported that the FLI had offered a grant of $100,000 to a foundation set up by Nya Dagbladet, a Swedish far-right online newspaper. In response, Tegmark said that the institute had only become aware of Nya Dagbladet's positions during due diligence processes a few months after the grant was initially offered, and that the grant had been immediately revoked.

=== Open letter on an AI pause ===
In March 2023, FLI published a letter titled "Pause Giant AI Experiments: An Open Letter". This called on major AI developers to agree on a verifiable six-month pause of any systems "more powerful than GPT-4" and to use that time to institute a framework for ensuring safety; or, failing that, for governments to step in with a moratorium. The letter said: "recent months have seen AI labs locked in an out-of-control race to develop and deploy ever more powerful digital minds that no-one - not even their creators - can understand, predict, or reliably control". The letter referred to the possibility of "a profound change in the history of life on Earth" as well as potential risks of AI-generated propaganda, loss of jobs, human obsolescence, and society-wide loss of control.

Prominent signatories of the letter included Elon Musk, Steve Wozniak, Evan Sharp, Chris Larsen, and Gary Marcus; AI lab CEOs Connor Leahy and Emad Mostaque; politician Andrew Yang; deep-learning researcher Yoshua Bengio; and Yuval Noah Harari. Marcus stated "the letter isn't perfect, but the spirit is right." Mostaque stated, "I don't think a six month pause is the best idea or agree with everything but there are some interesting things in that letter." In contrast, Bengio explicitly endorsed the six-month pause in a press conference. Musk predicted that "Leading AGI developers will not heed this warning, but at least it was said." Some signatories, including Musk, said they were motivated by fears of existential risk from artificial general intelligence. Some of the other signatories, such as Marcus, instead said they signed out of concern about risks such as AI-generated propaganda.

The authors of one of the papers cited in FLI's letter, "On the Dangers of Stochastic Parrots: Can Language Models Be Too Big?" including Emily M. Bender, Timnit Gebru, and Margaret Mitchell, criticised the letter. Mitchell said that “by treating a lot of questionable ideas as a given, the letter asserts a set of priorities and a narrative on AI that benefits the supporters of FLI. Ignoring active harms right now is a privilege that some of us don’t have.”

=== Windfall Trust ===
In 2024, a new project to study policy responses and scenario planning was incubated at FLI by Anna Yelizarova, and was spun off to become the Windfall Trust.

=== Open letter on prohibiting superintelligence ===
In October 2025, another letter, the "Statement on Superintelligence", was published. It called for a prohibition on the development of superintelligence not lifted before there is "broad scientific consensus that it will be done safely and controllably" and "strong public buy-in". FLI President Anthony Aguirre explained that "time is running out", expecting that the technology could arrive in as little as one to two years and counting on "widespread realization among society at all its levels" to stop it. He added that "whether it's soon or it takes a while, after we develop superintelligence, the machines are going to be in charge" and "that is not an experiment that we want to just run toward".

The list of signatories included Nobel laureates Geoffrey Hinton, Daron Acemoglu, Beatrice Fihn, Frank Wilczek and John C. Mather as well as Hinton's fellow "godfather" of modern AI Yoshua Bengio, Steve Wozniak, Steve Bannon, Paolo Benanti, Prince Harry, Duke of Sussex and Meghan, Duchess of Sussex. The letter was also signed by the actors Joseph Gordon-Levitt and Stephen Fry, rapper Will.i.am and author Yuval Noah Harari. Former national security advisor Susan Rice, and OpenAI member of technical staff Leo Gao also signed their names to the letter.

Polling released alongside the letter showed that 64% of American agreed that superintelligence "shouldn't be developed until it's provably safe and controllable" and only 5% believed it should be developed as quickly as possible.

=== Pro-human declaration ===
In March 2026, FLI organized the Pro-Human AI Declaration, which calls itself a cross-partisan statement calling for AI to serve humanity rather than replace it. The declaration outlined five principles covering human control of AI systems:

1. Keeping humans in charge
2. Avoiding concentration of power
3. Protecting the human experience
4. Human agency and liberty
5. Responsibility and accountability for AI companies

Endorsers included former U.S. National Security Advisor Susan Rice, consumer advocate Ralph Nader, conservative commentators Steve Bannon and Glenn Beck, and Turing Award laureate Yoshua Bengio. Among the organizational backers of the declaration were the American Federation of Teachers, the Congress of Christian Leaders and the Progressive Democrats of America. The declaration called for measures including a prohibition on superintelligence development until proven safe, mandatory pre-deployment safety testing for consumer-facing AI systems, and criminal liability for executives responsible for prohibited or catastrophic AI harms. By September 2026, the declaration was signed by more than 1 million people.

== Operations ==
=== Advocacy ===
FLI has actively contributed to policymaking on AI. In October 2023, for example, U.S. Senate majority leader Chuck Schumer invited FLI to share its perspective on AI regulation with selected senators. In March 2026, Florida Governor Ron DeSantis directed state agencies to partner with FLI to produce a Crisis Counselor Training Curriculum and a statewide AI Harms Reporting Form targeting dangerous AI companion applications.

In Europe, FLI successfully advocated for the inclusion of more general AI systems, such as GPT-4, in the EU's Artificial Intelligence Act.

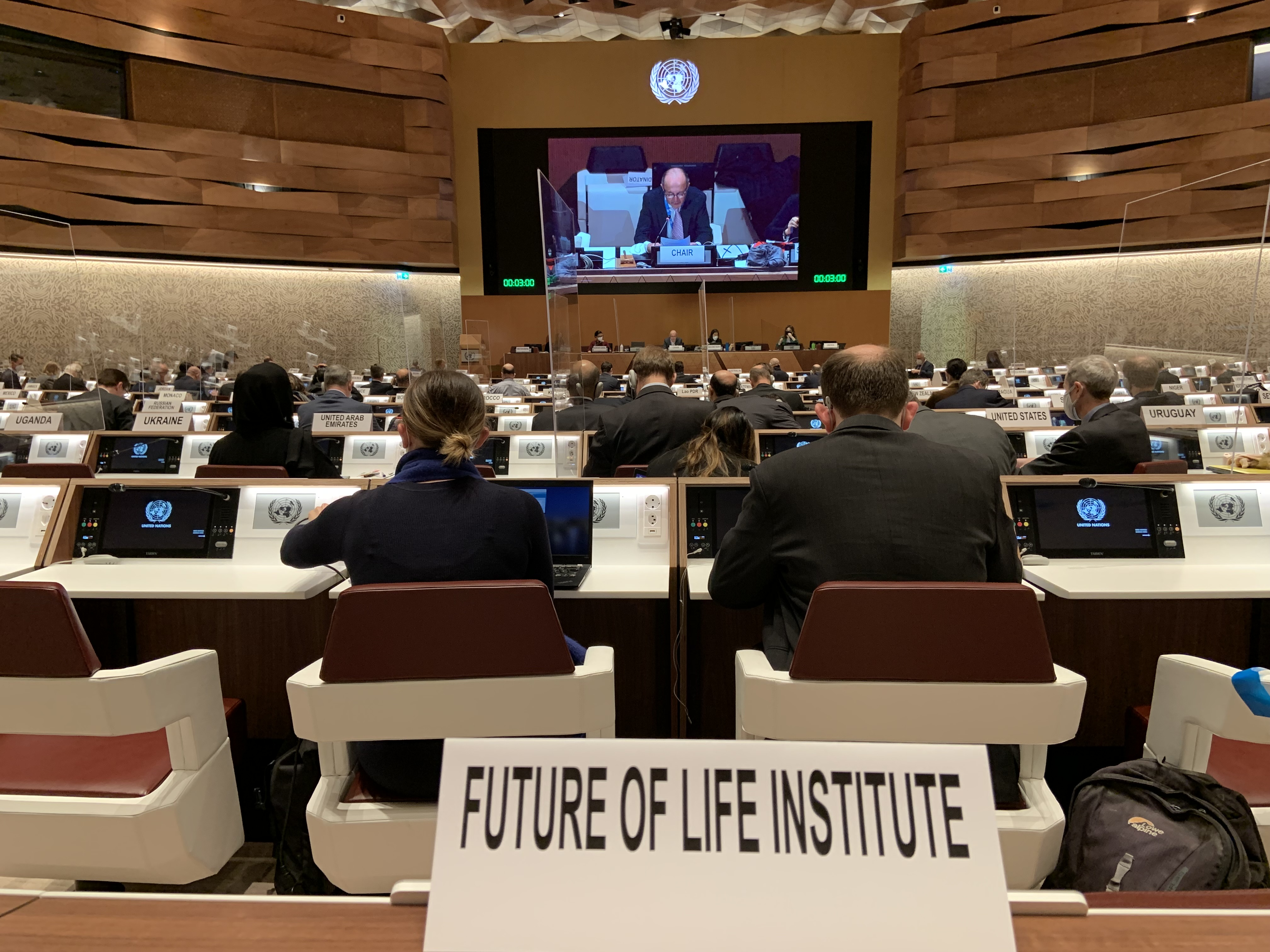
FLI at the United Nations, Geneva HQ, 2021. On autonomous weapons.

In military policy, FLI coordinated the support of the scientific community for the Treaty on the Prohibition of Nuclear Weapons. At the UN and elsewhere, the institute has also advocated for a treaty on autonomous weapons.

=== Research grants ===
The FLI research program started in 2015 with an initial donation of $10 million from Elon Musk. In this initial round, a total of $7 million was awarded to 37 research projects. In July 2021, FLI announced that it would launch a new $25 million grant program with funding from the Russian-Canadian programmer Vitalik Buterin.

=== Conferences ===
In 2014, the Future of Life Institute held its opening event at MIT: a panel discussion on "The Future of Technology: Benefits and Risks", moderated by Alan Alda. The panelists were synthetic biologist George Church, geneticist Ting Wu, economist Andrew McAfee, physicist and Nobel laureate Frank Wilczek, and Skype co-founder Jaan Tallinn.

Since 2015, FLI has organised biannual conferences with the stated purpose of bringing together AI researchers from academia and industry. As of November 2026, the following conferences have taken place:

- "The Future of AI: Opportunities and Challenges" conference in Puerto Rico (2015). The stated goal was to identify promising research directions that could help maximize the future benefits of AI. At the conference, FLI circulated an open letter on AI safety which was subsequently signed by Stephen Hawking, Elon Musk, and many artificial intelligence researchers.
- The Beneficial AI conference in Asilomar, California (2017), a private gathering of what The New York Times called "heavy hitters of A.I." (including Yann LeCun, Elon Musk, and Nick Bostrom). The institute released a set of principles for responsible AI development that came out of the discussion at the conference, signed by Yoshua Bengio, Yann LeCun, and many other AI researchers. These principles may have influenced the regulation of artificial intelligence and subsequent initiatives, such as the OECD Principles on Artificial Intelligence.
- The beneficial AGI conference in Puerto Rico (2019). The stated focus of the meeting was answering long-term questions with the goal of ensuring that artificial general intelligence is beneficial to humanity.
- A conference in New Orleans, Louisiana (2026), convening technologists, ethicists, policymakers, and faith leaders to discuss balancing AI development with safety and 'what it means to keep the future human' in the age of advanced AI. The meetings aimed to define goals for a pro-human movement, steering AI development toward benefiting life rather than replacement.

== See also ==
- Future of Humanity Institute – 2005–2024 Oxford University research centre
- Centre for the Study of Existential Risk – English existential risk research centre
- Global catastrophic risk – Hypothetical global-scale disaster risk
- Leverhulme Centre for the Future of Intelligence – University of Cambridge research centre
- Machine Intelligence Research Institute – Nonprofit AI safety organization
- The Precipice: Existential Risk and the Future of Humanity – 2020 book by Toby Ord
