= Mila (research institute) =

Research laboratory in Montreal, Canada

- Established: 1993 (33 years ago)
- Founders: Yoshua Bengio
- Location: Little Italy, Montreal
- Coordinates: 45°31′51″N 73°36′49″W

Mila – Quebec AI Institute (originally Montreal Institute for Learning Algorithms) is a research institute in Montreal, Quebec, focusing mainly on machine learning research. Approximately 1000 students and researchers and 100 faculty members, were part of Mila in 2022. Along with Alberta's Amii and Toronto's Vector Institute, Mila is part of the Pan-Canadian Artificial Intelligence Strategy.

== History ==
Mila was founded in 1993 by Université de Montréal professor Yoshua Bengio, a Turing Award winner who is one of the founders of the field of deep learning and is the most-cited living scientist across all fields (by total citations). It was originally named the Laboratoire d'informatique des systèmes adaptatifs (LISA). Mila also traces its history to the Reasoning and Learning Lab (RL-Lab) at McGill University, which was founded in 2001 and is currently co-directed by Professors Prakash Panangaden, Doina Precup, Joëlle Pineau, and Jackie Chi Kit Cheung.

In 2017, Mila was newly established as a partnership between the Université de Montréal and McGill University, along with École Polytechnique de Montréal and HEC Montréal.

In December 2020, Mila teamed up with IBM to accelerate artificial intelligence (AI) and machine learning research using open-source technology in a bid to integrate the Quebec institute's open-source software, Oríon, with IBM's Watson Machine Learning Accelerator, an AI model training and inference tool that the tech giant offers to businesses.

== Notable researchers ==
Besides Bengio, Mila's faculty members include Joëlle Pineau and Doina Precup. Some of its graduates include Marc Bellemare (MSc 2007 – RL-Lab), Hugo Larochelle (PhD 2009 – LISA) and Ian Goodfellow (PhD 2014 – LISA).

== Research activities ==
Research at Mila is largely, but not exclusively focused on deep learning and reinforcement learning. Specific research topics include:

- generative models
- natural language processing
- meta learning
- computer vision
- reinforcement learning
- applications of AI, including: climate change research and COVID-19 research.
- artificial general intelligence
- superintelligence
- AI alignment
- AGI governance
- frontier models

== Board of Directors ==
Board of Directors that watch over Mila's strategic directions are:

- Alexandre Le Bouthillier, General Partner – Linearis
- Alexandre Synett
- Anne-Marie Hubert, Managing Partner – Ernst & Young
- Benoit Boulet, Associate Dean (Research & Innovation) – McGill University
- Caroline Aubé, Director of Research and Knowledge Transfer, HEC Montreal
- Eugénie Brouillet, Associate Dean (Research, Creation and Innovation) – Université Laval
- Frédéric Bouchard, Dean Faculty of Arts and Science – Université de Montréal
- Josée Morin, Company Administrator
- Magaly Charbonneau, Hi-tech Venture Capitalist – Inovia Capital
- Marie-Josée Hébert, Vice Rector, Research, Discovery, Creation and Innovation – Université de Montréal
- Martha Crago, Vice-Principal, Research and Innovation – McGill University
- Mathieu Gervais, Observer, Assistant Deputy Minister for Science and Innovation at the Ministère de l'Économie et de l'innovation
- Pierre Boivin, President, Board of Directors, President and Chief Executive Officer – Claridge
- Valerie Pisano, Observer, Board of Directors, President and CEO – Mila
- Yoshua Bengio, Observer, Board of Directors, Scientific Director, Mila & IVADO

== Other activities ==
Mila is both a research and educational institution, providing postdoc and internship positions, and providing a research environment for students enrolled in their respective universities and working towards their graduate degrees such as PhD and Master's degrees in machine learning.

Mila members have also contributed to open-source software. Theano, one of the early programming frameworks for deep learning originated at MILA. In 2020, active projects included myia, a deep learning framework for Python, and baby-ai, a platform for simulating language learning with a human in the loop.

In addition, Mila is also involved in numerous partnerships with private companies.
