= Dario Amodei =

American businessman (born 1983)

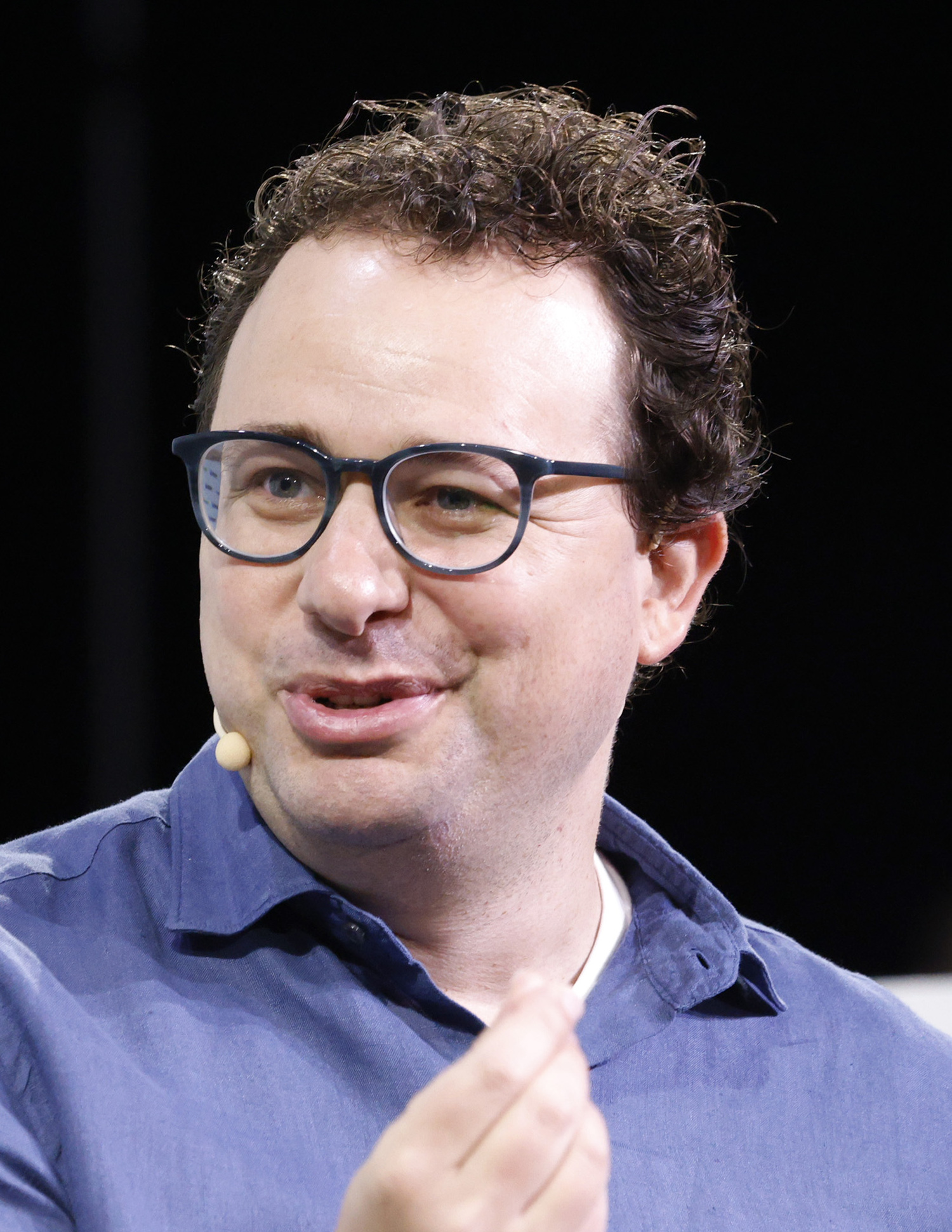
- Amodei in 2023
- Born: Dario Gabriele Amodei; January 13, 1983 (age 43); San Francisco County, California, U.S.
- Education: California Institute of Technology (attended); Stanford University (BS); Princeton University (MS, PhD)
- Known for: Co-founder and CEO of Anthropic
- Spouse: Camilla Clark (m. 2022)
- Relatives: Daniela Amodei (sister)
- Awards: Time 100 (2025)
- Scientific career
- Fields: Machine learning, biophysics
- Workplaces: Stanford Medicine; OpenAI
- Thesis: Network-Scale Electrophysiology: Measuring and Understanding the Collective Behavior of Neural Circuits (2011)
- Doctoral advisor: Michael J. Berry; William Bialek
- Website: darioamodei.com

Dario Gabriele Amodei (born January 13, 1983) is an American artificial intelligence (AI) entrepreneur and researcher. In 2021, he and his sister Daniela Amodei founded Anthropic, the company behind the large language model series Claude. Before that, he was the vice president of research at OpenAI. At over US$1.5 trillion as of November 2026, Anthropic is one of the most valuable AI pure play companies, rivaled by OpenAI.

Amodei earned a doctorate in biophysics from Princeton University. From 2014 to 2016, he worked on machine learning at Baidu and Google Brain. At OpenAI, he worked on the development of GPT-2, GPT-3, and reinforcement learning from human feedback.

Amodei has led an AI safety culture at Anthropic, and has expressed a probability of catastrophic harm from AI at 10–25%. He has advocated for democratic nations to maintain an AI lead to deter authoritarian nations, especially China, via advanced military AI and semiconductor export controls. Since 2026, Amodei has called for coordinating to slow down AI development, especially recursive self-improvement, while engaging China in arms control-analogous diplomacy. Time magazine listed Amodei as one of the world's 100 most influential people in 2025 and 2026.

== Early life ==
Dario Amodei was born in 1983 in San Francisco, California. His sister, Daniela, was born four years later. His father, Riccardo Amodei, an Italian-American leather craftsman from Massa Marittima, Tuscany, died of hepatitis C when Dario was 23 years old. His mother, Elena Engel, a Jewish American born in Chicago, worked as a project manager for library renovations.

Dario grew up in San Francisco and graduated from Lowell High School. He was a member of the USA Physics Olympiad team in 2000. Amodei began college at Caltech, where he worked with Tom Tombrello as one of his Physics 11 students. In 2004, he transferred to Stanford University, where he received in 2006 a bachelor's degree in physics. He became a Hertz fellow and received a doctorate in biophysics and computational neuroscience from Princeton University. In 2011, he started studying cancer cells as a postdoctoral researcher at the Stanford University School of Medicine.

Amodei became interested in the writings of Ray Kurzweil and Eliezer Yudkowsky. In 2008, he became active on the email lists and forums of GiveWell, a global health charity evaluator.

== Career ==
From November 2014 until October 2015, he worked at Baidu.

In 2015, he joined Google Brain. He co-published in 2016 the paper "Concrete Problems in AI Safety".

In 2016, Amodei joined OpenAI, where he led an AI safety team and a team studying scaling laws. He contributed to the development of GPT-2, GPT-3, and reinforcement learning from human feedback. He and his sister Daniela conflicted with OpenAI's president Greg Brockman and its CEO Sam Altman. In 2020, they left OpenAI along with nine other employees.

In 2021, Dario co-founded Anthropic along with Daniela and five other former senior members of OpenAI including Jared Kaplan and Chris Olah. In November 2023, the board of directors of OpenAI approached Amodei about replacing Sam Altman and potentially merging the two startups. Amodei declined both offers.

Time magazine listed Amodei as one of the world's 100 most influential people in 2025, and again in 2026 alongside Daniela. He also was named as one of the "Architects of AI" for Time's Person of the Year.

As of May 2026, Anthropic has an estimated value of $965 billion, with Forbes estimating Amodei's net worth to be $15.5 billion.

In September 2026, Amodei called for the technology industry to slow the pace of AI development and said Anthropic would allow independent evaluators permanent access to its models to assess whether the company was following its safety commitments. In Anthropic's IPO financials and prospectus release, it was disclosed that Amodei's compensation package in 2025 tallied $18 million, including stocks. Their IPO is valued at $2 trillion as of October 2026.

The Wall Street Journal stated that at Anthropic, Amodei serves as "ideological leader", with only one direct report, while his sister Daniela, the President and board chair, "oversees day-to-day operations and manages the executive team."

=== Dispute with the Department of Defense ===
In February 2026, Amodei refused to remove a contractual ban on Claude usage for mass domestic surveillance or fully autonomous weapons, as requested by Pete Hegseth's Department of Defense (DoD). Anthropic was subsequently labeled a DoD "supply-chain risk" and the Trump administration ordered US agencies to stop using Claude. The Pentagon denied interest in such use cases but insisted on unrestricted access. The DoD's actions have been condemned as illegal retaliation against protected speech with several organizations filing amicus briefs supporting Anthropic. On March 26, 2026, a federal judge issued a temporary injunction against the DoD, agreeing that their actions appeared to be "classic First Amendment retaliation."

== Views ==
Friends and colleagues described Amodei's worldview as shaped by rationalism and effective altruism.

Amodei has promoted an AI safety culture at Anthropic, and has expressed a probability of catastrophic harm from AI at 10–25%. Amodei has advocated for democratic nations to maintain a lead in the AI arms race to deter authoritarian nations, especially China. Since 2026, Amodei has also called for a slowdown of AI development, especially recursive self-improvement by democratic states, while engaging China in arms control-analogous diplomacy.

In October 2024, Amodei published an essay titled "Machines of Loving Grace", in which he speculated about how AI could radically improve human welfare.

In January 2026, Amodei published a follow-up essay titled "The Adolescence of Technology", which focuses on the risks posed by powerful AI. According to Amodei, AI systems may develop goals or behaviors misaligned with human intentions. Another stated risk involves AI allowing people without specialized training to create biological weapons or weapons of mass destruction. Amodei also said that AI could enable authoritarian governments to conduct unprecedented surveillance, deploy autonomous weapons, and engage in mass propaganda. He described the Chinese Communist Party as the greatest threat in this regard, arguing that democracies must maintain AI leadership to prevent a "global totalitarian dictatorship".

== Personal life ==
In 2014, Amodei was diagnosed with testicular cancer and made a full recovery following chemotherapy treatment. Amodei began dating Camilla Clark in 2014 and married her in 2022. Clark has been an influential advisor to Amodei at Anthropic, and helped the company to secure investment in 2021 from her former boyfriend, Google CEO Eric Schmidt. She was also active as an entrepreneur herself and attempted in 2011 to win Jeffrey Epstein as an investor for an adult entertainment business she had founded.
