= Yoshua Bengio =

Canadian computer scientist (born 1964)

Yoshua Bengio OC OQ OBE FRS FRSC
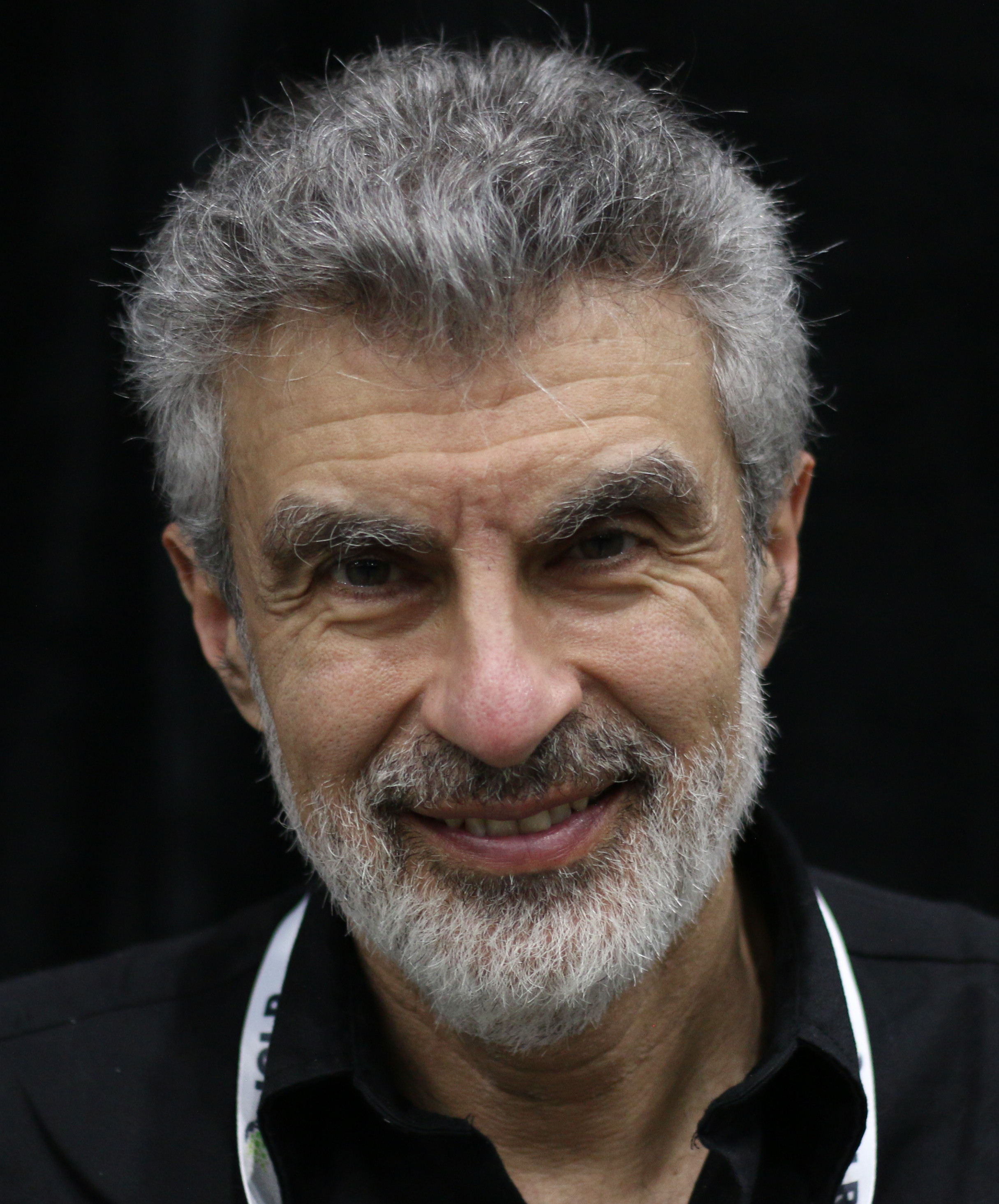
- Bengio at ICLR 2025
- Born: March 5, 1964 (age 62); Paris, France
- Citizenship: Canada
- Education: McGill University (BSc, MSc, PhD)
- Known for: Deep learning; Neural machine translation; Generative adversarial networks; Attention models; Word embeddings; Denoising autoencoders; Language models; Learning to learn; Generative flow networks
- Relatives: Samy Bengio (brother)
- Awards: Marie-Victorin Prize (2017); Turing Award (2018); AAAI Fellow (2019); Legion of Honor (2022); Princess of Asturias Award (2022); VinFuture Prize (2024); Honorary Doctorate (2025); Queen Elizabeth Prize for Engineering (2025)
- Scientific career
- Fields: Machine learning Deep learning Artificial intelligence
- Workplaces: Université de Montréal; Mila; LawZero; Element AI
- Thesis: Artificial Neural Networks and their Application to Sequence Recognition (1991)
- Doctoral advisor: Renato De Mori
- Notable students: Ian Goodfellow; David Krueger
- Website: yoshuabengio.org

Yoshua Bengio OC OQ OBE FRS FRSC (born March 5, 1964) is a Canadian computer scientist, and a pioneer of artificial neural networks and deep learning.

Bengio received the 2018 ACM A.M. Turing Award, often referred to as the "Nobel Prize of Computing", with Geoffrey Hinton and Yann LeCun for their foundational work on deep learning. Bengio, Hinton, and LeCun are sometimes referred to as the "Godfathers of AI".

Bengio is the most-cited computer scientist globally (by both total citations and by h-index), and the most-cited living scientist across all fields (by total citations). In November 2025, Bengio became the first AI researcher with more than a million Google Scholar citations. In 2024, Time magazine included Bengio in its yearly list of the world's 100 most influential people.

Bengio is a professor at the Université de Montréal and co-president and scientific director of the nonprofit LawZero. He founded Mila, the Quebec Artificial Intelligence (AI) Institute, and was its scientific director until 2025.

== Early life and education ==
Bengio was born in France to a Sephardic Jewish family who had emigrated to France from Morocco. The family then relocated to Canada. He received his Bachelor of Engineering degree (Computer engineering), MSc (computer science) and PhD (computer science) from McGill University.

Bengio is the brother of Samy Bengio, also an influential computer scientist working with neural networks, who is senior director of AI and ML research at Apple.

The Bengio brothers lived in Morocco for a year during their father's military service there. His father, Carlo Bengio was a pharmacist and a playwright; he ran a Sephardic theater company in Montreal that performed pieces in Judeo-Arabic. His mother, Célia Moreno, was an actress in the 1970s in the Moroccan theater scene led by Tayeb Seddiki. She studied economics in Paris, and then in Montreal in 1980 she co-founded with artist Paul St-Jean l’Écran humain, a multimedia theater troupe.

== Career and research ==
After his PhD, Bengio was a postdoctoral fellow at MIT (supervised by Michael I. Jordan) and AT&T Bell Labs. Bengio has been a faculty member at the Université de Montréal since 1993, heads the MILA (Montreal Institute for Learning Algorithms) and is co-director of the Learning in Machines & Brains program at the Canadian Institute for Advanced Research.

Along with Geoffrey Hinton and Yann LeCun, Bengio is considered by journalist Cade Metz to be one of the three people most responsible for the advancement of deep learning during the 1990s and 2000s. Bengio et al. introduced the neural probabilistic language model, which learned distributed representations (word embeddings) for words to overcome the "curse of dimensionality" in natural language processing. Among the computer scientists with an h-index of at least 100, Bengio was as of 2018 the one with the most recent citations per day, according to MILA. As of August 2024, he has the highest Discipline H-index (D-index, a measure of the research citations a scientist has received) of any computer scientist. Thanks to a 2019 article on a novel RNN architecture, Bengio has an Erdős number of 3.

In October 2016, Bengio co-founded Element AI, a Montreal-based artificial intelligence incubator that turns AI research into real-world business applications. The company sold its operations to ServiceNow in November 2020, with Bengio remaining at ServiceNow as an advisor. Bengio currently serves as scientific and technical advisor for Recursion Pharmaceuticals and scientific advisor for Valence Discovery.

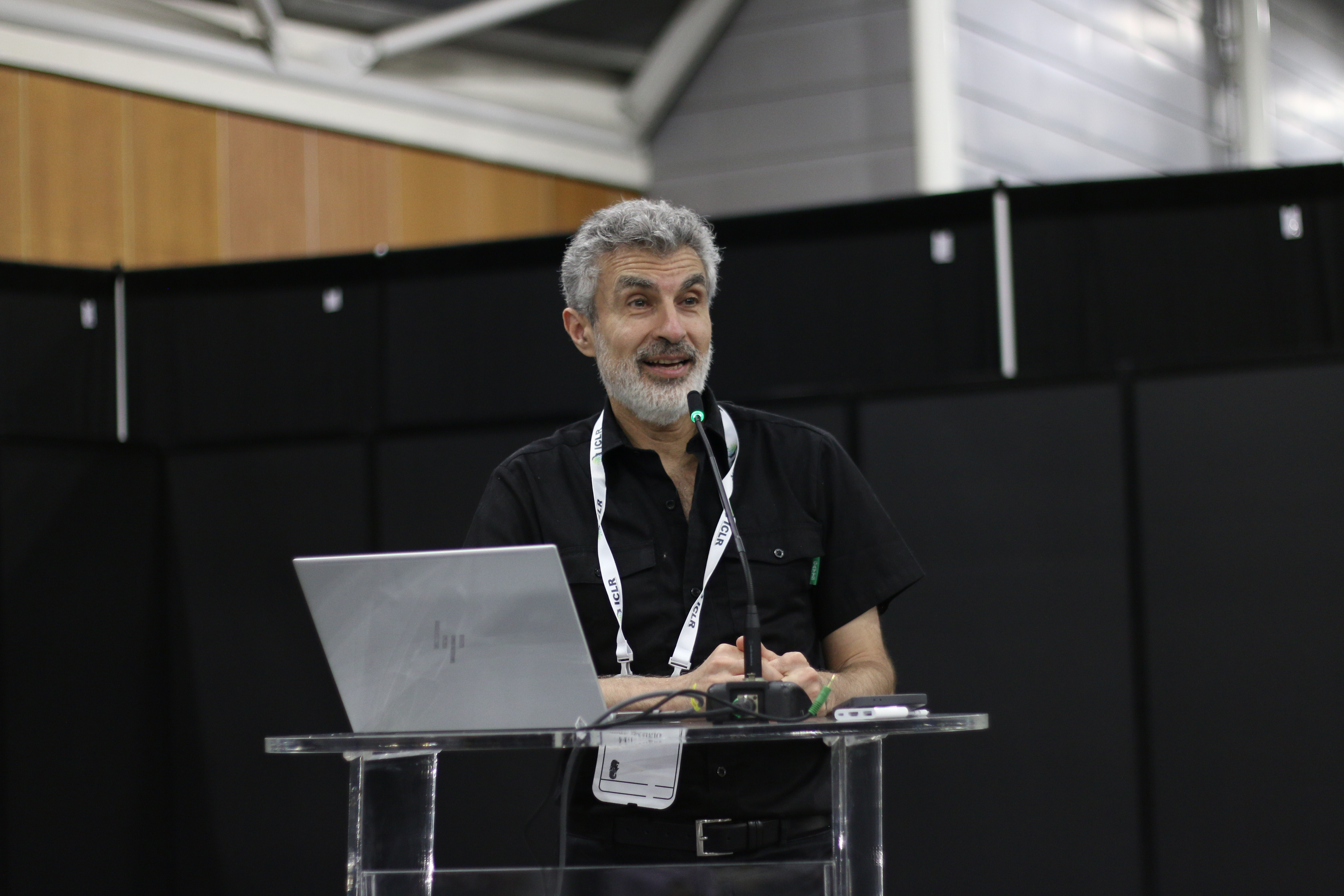
Bengio at ICLR 2025

At the first AI Safety Summit in November 2023, British Prime Minister Rishi Sunak announced that Bengio would lead an international scientific report on the safety of advanced AI. An interim version of the report was delivered at the AI Seoul Summit in May 2024, and covered issues such as the potential for cyber attacks and 'loss of control' scenarios. The full report was published in January 2025 as the International AI Safety Report, for which Bengio continues to serve as Chair.

In June 2025, Bengio launched a nonprofit organization, LawZero, aimed at building "honest" AI systems that can detect and block harmful behavior by autonomous agents. The group is developing a system called Scientist AI, intended to act as a guardrail by predicting whether an agent’s actions could cause harm. Bengio stated that the project’s first goal was to demonstrate the methodology and then scale it up with support from donors, governments, or AI labs. LawZero’s funders include the Future of Life Institute, Schmidt Sciences, the Gates Foundation and the Canadian government.

In February 2026, Bengio was appointed to the United Nations' Independent International Scientific Panel on AI, a group of 40 experts tasked with preparing a report outlining the current state of AI science, namely the opportunities, impacts, and risks of AI systems, with the ultimate aim of providing a clear evidence base for global policymakers. Bengio was later appointed Co-Chair of the Panel alongside Nobel laureate Maria Ressa.

Bengio has also trained other notable AI researchers throughout his career, including David Krueger, Ian Goodfellow, and Hugo Larochelle.

=== Views on AI ===
In March 2023, following concerns raised by AI experts about the existential risk from artificial general intelligence, Bengio signed an open letter from the Future of Life Institute calling for "all AI labs to immediately pause for at least 6 months the training of AI systems more powerful than GPT-4". The letter has been signed by over 30,000 individuals, including AI researchers such as Stuart Russell and Gary Marcus.

In May 2023, Bengio stated in an interview to BBC that he felt "lost" over his life's work. He raised his concern about "bad actors" getting hold of AI, especially as it becomes more sophisticated and powerful. He called for better regulation, product registration, ethical training, and more involvement from governments in tracking and auditing AI products.

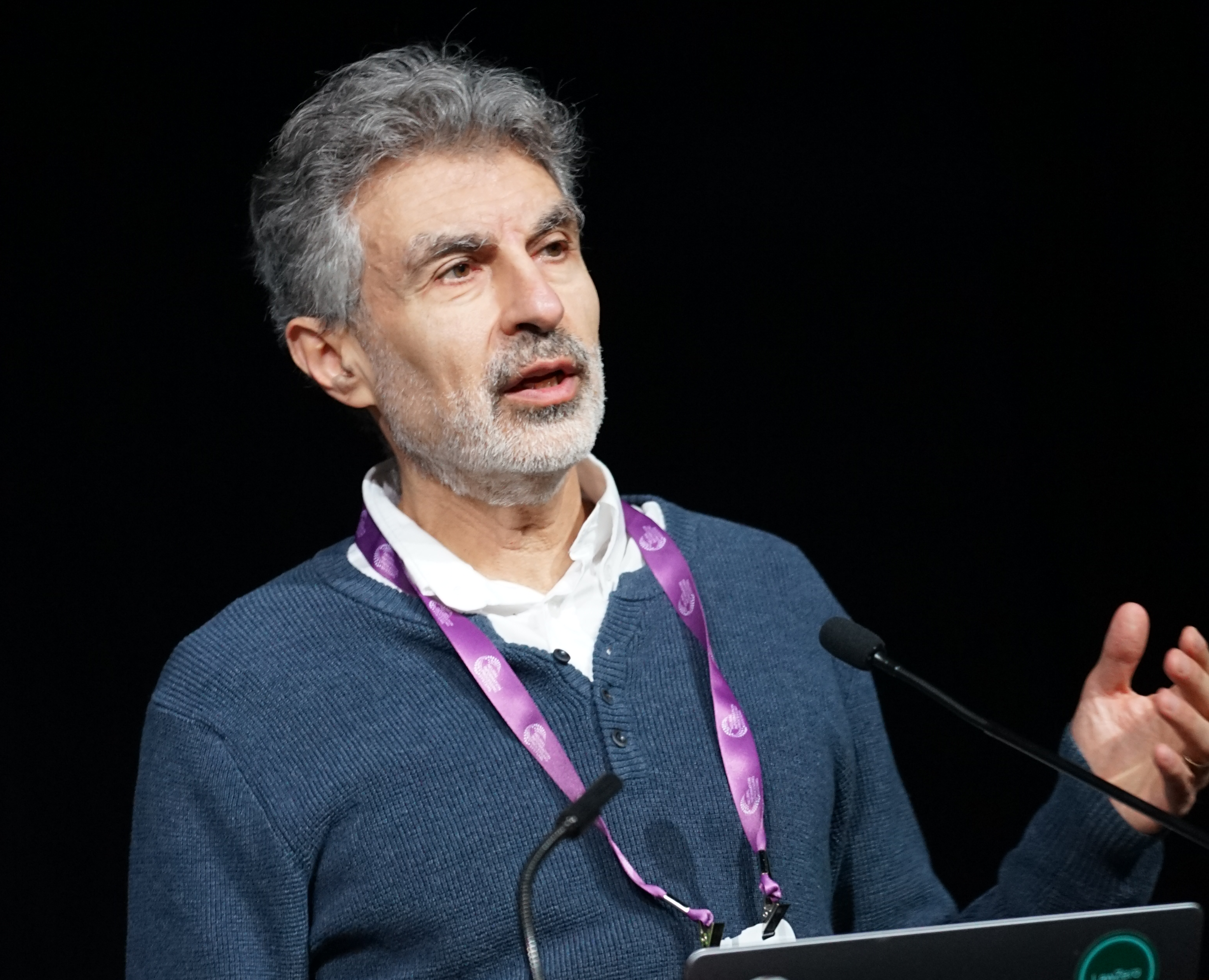
Bengio speaking in 2025

Speaking with the Financial Times in May 2023, Bengio said that he supported the monitoring of access to AI systems such as ChatGPT so that potentially illegal or dangerous uses could be tracked. In July 2023, he published a piece in The Economist arguing that "the risk of catastrophe is real enough that action is needed now."

Bengio co-authored a letter with Geoffrey Hinton and others in support of SB 1047, a California AI safety bill that would require companies training models which cost more than $100 million to perform risk assessments before deployment. They claimed the legislation was the "bare minimum for effective regulation of this technology."

In June 2025, Bengio expressed concern that some advanced AI systems were beginning to display traits such as deception, reward hacking, and situational awareness. He described these as indications of goal misalignment and potentially dangerous behaviors. In a Fortune article, he stated that the AI arms race was encouraging companies to prioritize capability improvements over safety research. He has also voiced support for strong regulation and international collaboration to address risks posed by advanced AI systems. In December 2025, Bengio said that granting rights to AI systems would be a "huge mistake", arguing that being able to shut them down is essential for safety.

In early 2026, through the process of working on the technical research at LawZero, Bengio expressed an increasing sense of optimism regarding the possibility of designing guardrails for existing AI systems to mitigate societal risks. He calls for a combination of technical and societal guardrails, including policy, governance, and legislative action.

Bengio being interviewed for the Dutch television series The Mind of the Universe

In September 2026, Bengio compared the current state of AI safety to the onset of the COVID-19 pandemic, when governments saw the need to act quickly to protect the public.

=== Awards and honours ===
In 2017, Bengio was named an Officer of the Order of Canada. The same year, he was nominated Fellow of the Royal Society of Canada and received the Marie-Victorin Quebec Prize. Together with Geoffrey Hinton and Yann LeCun, Bengio won the 2018 Turing Award.

In 2020, he was elected a Fellow of the Royal Society. In 2022, he received the Princess of Asturias Award in the category "Scientific Research" with his peers LeCun, Hinton and Demis Hassabis. In 2023, Bengio was appointed Knight of the Legion of Honour, France's highest order of merit.

In August 2023, Bengio was appointed to a United Nations scientific advisory council on technological advances. He was also recognized as a 2023 ACM Fellow.

In 2024, Time magazine included Bengio in its yearly list of the 100 most influential people globally. In the same year, he was awarded VinFuture Prize's grand prize along with Hinton, LeCun, Jen-Hsun Huang and Fei-Fei Li for pioneering advancements in neural networks and deep learning algorithms.

In 2025, Bengio was awarded the Queen Elizabeth Prize for Engineering jointly with Bill Dally, Hinton, John Hopfield, Yann LeCun, Huang and Fei-Fei Li. That same year, he was a recipient of an honorary doctorate from McGill University, and he was made an Officer of the National Order of Quebec.

== Publications ==
- Ian Goodfellow, Yoshua Bengio and Aaron Courville: Deep Learning (Adaptive Computation and Machine Learning), MIT Press, Cambridge (USA), 2016. ISBN 978-0262035613.
- Dzmitry Bahdanau; Kyunghyun Cho; Yoshua Bengio (2014). "Neural Machine Translation by Jointly Learning to Align and Translate". arXiv:1409.0473 [cs.CL].
- Léon Bottou, Patrick Haffner, Paul G. Howard, Patrice Simard, Yoshua Bengio, Yann LeCun: High Quality Document Image Compression with DjVu, In: Journal of Electronic Imaging, Band 7, 1998, S. 410–425 doi:10.1117/1.482609
- Bengio, Yoshua; Schuurmans, Dale; Lafferty, John; Williams, Chris K. I. and Culotta, Aron (eds.), Advances in Neural Information Processing Systems 22 (NIPS'22), December 7th–10th, 2009, Vancouver, BC, Neural Information Processing Systems (NIPS) Foundation, 2009
- Y. Bengio, Dong-Hyun Lee, Jorg Bornschein, Thomas Mesnard, Zhouhan Lin: Towards Biologically Plausible Deep Learning, arXiv.org, 2016
- Bengio contributed one chapter to Architects of Intelligence: The Truth About AI from the People Building it, Packt Publishing, 2018, ISBN 978-1-78-913151-2, by the American futurist Martin Ford.
