= Why the Future Doesn't Need Us =

2000 article by Bill Joy

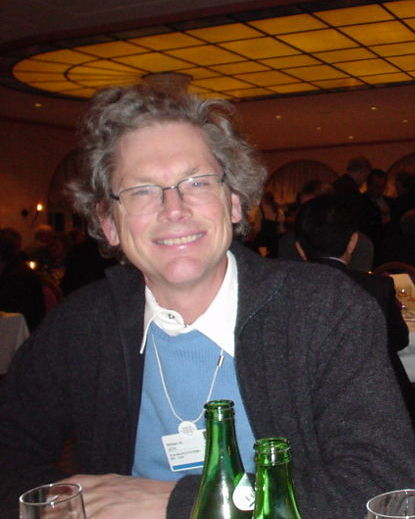
Bill Joy, 2003

"Why the Future Doesn't Need Us" is an article written by Bill Joy (then chief scientist at Sun Microsystems) in the April 2000 issue of Wired magazine. In the article, he argues that "Our most powerful 21st-century technologies—robotics, genetic engineering, and nanotech—are threatening to make humans an endangered species." Joy warns:

The experiences of the atomic scientists clearly show the need to take personal responsibility, the danger that things will move too fast, and the way in which a process can take on a life of its own. We can, as they did, create insurmountable problems in almost no time flat. We must do more thinking up front if we are not to be similarly surprised and shocked by the consequences of our inventions.

While some critics have characterized Joy's stance as obscurantism or neo-Luddism, others share his concerns about the consequences of rapidly expanding technology.

== Summary ==
Joy argues that developing technologies pose a much greater danger to humanity than any technology before has ever done. In particular, he focuses on genetic engineering, nanotechnology and robotics. He argues that 20th-century technologies of destruction such as the nuclear bomb were limited to large governments, due to the complexity and cost of such devices, as well as the difficulty in acquiring the required materials. He uses the novel The White Plague as a potential nightmare scenario, in which a mad scientist creates a virus capable of wiping out humanity.

Joy also voices concerns about increasing computer power. His worry is that computers will eventually become more intelligent than we are, leading to such dystopian scenarios as robot rebellion. He quotes Ted Kaczynski (the Unabomber).

Joy expresses concerns that eventually the rich will be the only ones that have the power to control the future robots that will be built and that these people could also decide to take life into their own hands and control how humans continue to populate and reproduce. He started doing more research into robotics and people that specialize in robotics, and outside of his own thoughts, he tried getting others' opinions on the topic. Rodney Brooks, a specialist in robotics, believes that in the future there will be a merge between humans and robots. Joy mentioned Hans Moravec's book ''Robot: Mere Machine to Transcendent Mind'' where he believed there will be a shift in the future where robots will take over normal human activities, but with time humans will become okay with living that way.

== Criticism ==
In The Singularity Is Near, Ray Kurzweil questioned the regulation of potentially dangerous technology, asking "Should we tell the millions of people afflicted with cancer and other devastating conditions that we are canceling the development of all bioengineered treatments because there is a risk that these same technologies may someday be used for malevolent purposes?" However, John Zerzan and Chellis Glendinning believe that modern technologies are bad for both freedom and the problem of cancer, and that the two issues are connected.

In the AAAS Science and Technology Policy Yearbook 2001 article "A Response to Bill Joy and the Doom-and-Gloom Technofuturists", John Seely Brown and Paul Duguid criticized Joy for having technological tunnel vision on his prediction by failing to consider social factors.

John McGinnis argues that Joy's proposal for "relinquishment" of technologies that might lead to artificial general intelligence (AGI) would fail because "prohibitions, at least under current technology and current geopolitics, are certain to be ineffective". Verification of AGI-limitation agreements would be difficult due to AGI's dual-use nature and ease of being hidden. Similarly, he feels that Joy's "Hippocratic oath" proposal of voluntary abstention by scientists from harmful research would not be effective either, because scientists might be pressured by governments, tempted by profits, uncertain which technologies would lead to harm down the road, or opposed to Joy's premise in the first place. Rather than relinquishment of AGI, McGinnis argues for a kind of differential technological development in which friendly artificial intelligence is advanced faster than other kinds.

Extropian futurist Max More shares Kurzweil's viewpoint on matters of the impractical and ineffective nature of "technological relinquishment," but adds a larger moral and philosophical component to the argument, arguing that the perfection and evolution of humanity is not "losing our humanity" and that voluntarily-sought increased capacity in any domain does not even represent "a loss" of any kind.

In Zac Goldsmith's article about Bill Joy's interview, he quotes him on how some concerns with new developing technologies are actually more dangerous than he expressed in the article, because Goldsmith claims that the developers of these machines are giving them too much power. Goldsmith states his belief that scientists don't think of a lot of things that can go wrong when they start making inventions, because that will lead to less funding.

In Sophie Tysom's review about Bill Joy's article she says Joy shouldn't be one minded when it comes to newer technology, and should also see that there could be a "compromise" made between him and those new technologies. She also agrees that he has a point for being worried about what will happen in the long run, but doesn't think that these technologies will try to control us in the future. Joy responded to this, stating that he liked that people were starting to respond to his article because it gave them an input on the subject.

== Aftermath ==
After the publication of the article, Bill Joy suggested assessing technologies to gauge their implicit dangers, as well as having scientists refuse to work on technologies that have the potential to cause harm.

In the 15th Anniversary issue of Wired in 2008, Lucas Graves's article reported that the genetics, nanotechnology, and robotics technologies have not reached the level that would make Bill Joy's scenario come true.

Noted conspiracy theorist Alex Jones cited the article during a discussion on the implications of transhumanism with podcasters Joe Rogan and Tim Dillon on the October 27, 2020 episode of The Joe Rogan Experience.
