= Information hazard =

Risk caused by disseminating information

An information hazard or infohazard is "a risk that arises from the dissemination of (true) information that may cause harm or enable some agent to cause harm". It was formalized by philosopher Nick Bostrom in 2011. It challenges the principle of freedom of information, as it states that some types of information are too dangerous, as people could either be harmed by it or use it to harm others. One example would be the instructions for creating a thermonuclear weapon. Following these instructions could cause massive amounts of harm to others, so limiting who has access to this information is important in preventing harm to others.

== Classification ==
According to Bostrom, there are two defined major categories of information hazard. The first is the "adversarial hazard" which is where some information can be purposefully used by a bad actor to hurt others. The other category is where the harm is not purposeful, but merely an unintended consequence that harms the person who learns about it.

Bostrom also proposes several subsets of these major categories, including the following types:

- Data hazards: A piece of data that can be used to harm others, such as the DNA sequence of a lethal pathogen.
- Idea hazards: General ideas that can harm others if fulfilled. One example is the idea of "using a fission reaction to create a bomb". Knowing this idea alone can be enough for a well-resourced team to develop a nuclear bomb.
- Knowing-too-much hazards: Information that, if known, can cause danger to the person who knows it. For example, in the 1600s, women who allegedly possessed knowledge of the occult or birth control methods were at a higher risk of being accused of witchcraft.

== Usage by context ==
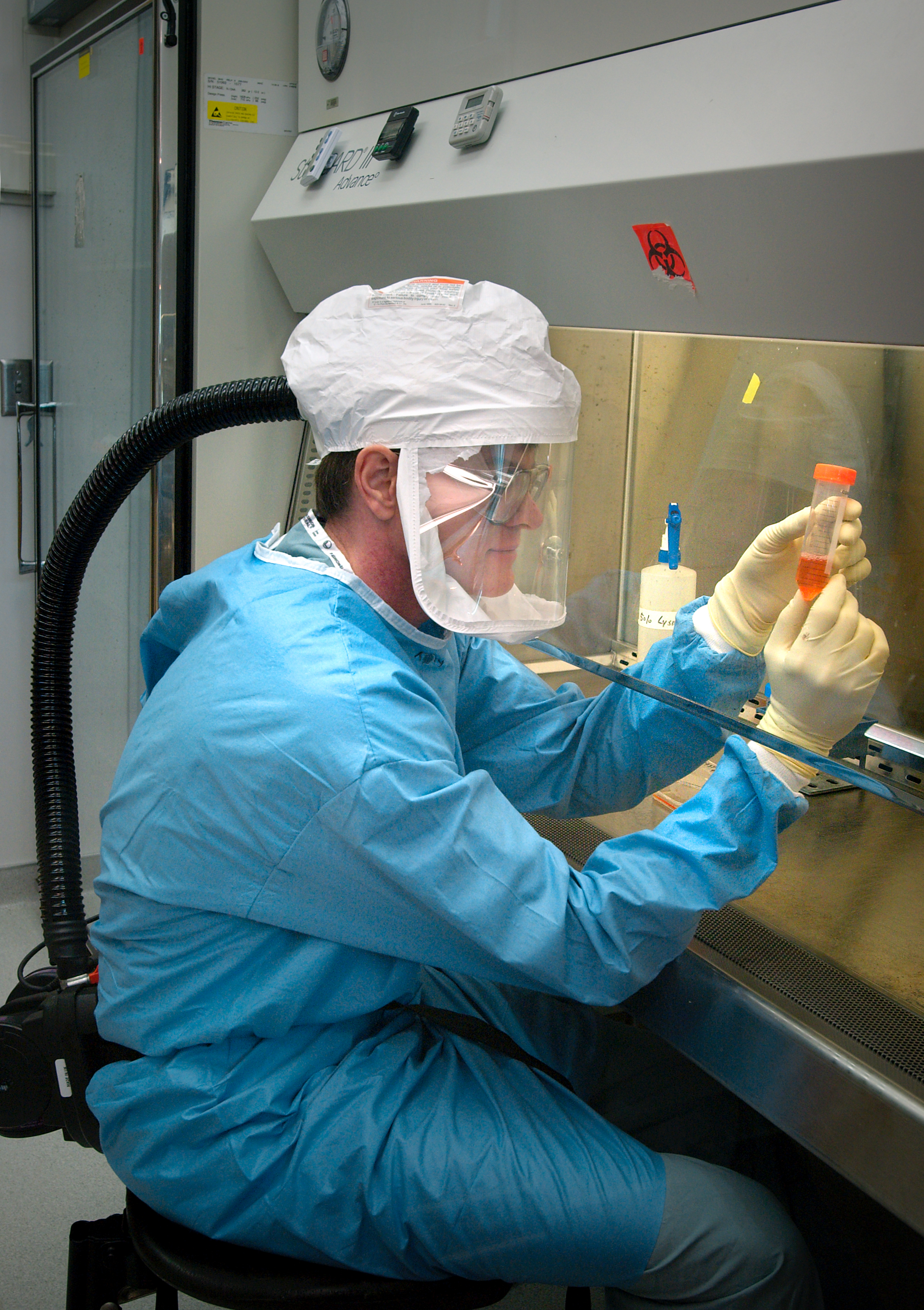
Terrence Tumpey examining a sample of the reconstructed Spanish flu in 2005. Releasing the sequence of the virus advanced research, but also sparked concern that a terrorist group could use it to cause a new pandemic.

=== Biotechnology ===
The availability of information on DNA sequences of diseases or the chemical makeup of toxins could lead to adversarial hazards, as bad actors could use this information in order to recreate these biohazards on their own. In 2018, a research paper led to media coverage by explaining how to synthesize a poxvirus.

=== Information security ===
The concept of information hazards is also relevant to information security. Many government, public, and private entities have information that could be classified as a data hazard that could harm others if leaked. This could be the result of an adversarial hazard or an idea hazard. To avoid this, many organizations implement security controls depending on their own needs or the needs laid out by regulatory bodies.

=== Law ===
Willful ignorance is the deliberate avoidance of knowledge of facts. In common law jurisdictions it is treated as equivalent to actual knowledge. It is applied in criminal proceedings and corporate liability cases, particularly where individuals or entities deliberately restrict their access to information to avoid legal or ethical responsibility.

=== Literature ===
The idea of forbidden knowledge that can harm the person who knows it is found in many stories in the 16th and 17th centuries, which imply or explicitly state that some knowledge is dangerous for the viewer or for others and is better left hidden.

=== Popular culture ===
The idea of an information hazard overlaps with the idea of a harmful trend or social contagion. In it, knowledge of certain trends can result in their replication, such as in the case of certain viral trends that can be physically dangerous to those who attempt them.

== See also ==
- BLIT (short story)
- Censorship
- Copycat suicide
- Infinite Jest, "The Entertainment" therein
- Information security
- Inquisition
- Jury nullification
- Knowledge (legal construct)
- Malinformation
- Mass shooting contagion
- Roko's basilisk
- SCP Foundation, where articles commonly use a paranormal reimagining of this device
- Social contagion
- The Funniest Joke in the World
- The Game (mind game)
- The King in Yellow
- Vulnerable world hypothesis
- House of Leaves
