= Our Final Invention =

2013 book by James Barrat

Our Final Invention: Artificial Intelligence and the End of the Human Era
- First edition
- Author: James Barrat
- Language: English
- Publisher: Thomas Dunne Books
- Publication date: October 1, 2013
- Publication place: United States
- Media type: Print (hardback)
- Pages: 336
- ISBN: 978-0-312-62237-4

Our Final Invention: Artificial Intelligence and the End of the Human Era is a 2013 non-fiction book by the American author James Barrat. The book discusses the potential benefits and possible risks of human-level (AGI) or super-human (ASI) artificial intelligence. Those risks include extermination of the human race.

A second edition with an additional preface was published in 2023. While happy that, 10 years of AI development later, many researchers have come to warn and write along Our Final Invention's alarm raising on potential risks, he concludes that preface saying "he is frightened" as the previous 10 years also witnessed the proliferation of self-improving AIs based on LLM released uncontrollably in the public domain by greedy "tech bros CEOs".

== Summary ==
James Barrat weaves together explanations of AI concepts, AI history, and interviews with prominent AI researchers including Eliezer Yudkowsky and Ray Kurzweil. The book starts with an account of how an artificial general intelligence could become an artificial super-intelligence through recursive self-improvement. In subsequent chapters, the book covers the history of AI, including an account of the work done by I. J. Good, up to the work and ideas of researchers in the field today.

Throughout the book, Barrat takes a cautionary tone, focusing on the threats artificial super-intelligence poses to human existence. Barrat emphasizes how difficult it would be to control or even to predict the actions of something that may become orders of magnitude more intelligent than the most intelligent humans.

== Reception ==
On 13 December 2013, journalist Matt Miller interviewed Barrat for his podcast, "This... is interesting". The interview and related matters to Barrat's book, Our Final Invention, were then captured in Miller's weekly opinion piece for The Washington Post.

Seth Baum, executive director of the Global Catastrophic Risk Institute and one of the people cited by Barrat in his book, reviewed the book favorably on Scientific American's "invited guest" blog, calling it a welcome counterpoint to the vision articulated by Ray Kurzweil in his book The Singularity is Near.

Gary Marcus questions Barrat's argument "that tendencies toward self-preservation and resource acquisition are inherent in any sufficiently complex, goal-driven system", noting that present-day AI does not have such drives, but Marcus concedes "that the goals of machines could change as they get smarter", and he feels that "Barrat is right to ask" about these important issues.

Our Final Invention was a Huffington Post Definitive Tech Book of 2013.

== See also ==
- Artificial intelligence
- Ethics of artificial intelligence
- Technological singularity
- AI box
- Friendly artificial intelligence
