= SIAI =

SIAI may refer to:

- Singularity Institute for Artificial Intelligence, now Machine Intelligence Research Institute
- SIAI-Marchetti, formerly Società Idrovolanti Alta Italia ('Seaplane Company of Upper Italy')
