= Pascal's mugging =

Philosophical thought experiment about utility

In philosophy, Pascal's mugging is a thought experiment demonstrating a problem in expected utility maximization. A rational agent should choose actions whose outcomes, when weighted by their probability, have higher utility. But some very unlikely outcomes may have very great utilities, and these utilities can grow faster than the probability diminishes. Hence the agent should focus more on vastly improbable cases with implausibly high rewards; this leads first to counter-intuitive choices, and then to incoherence as the utility of every choice becomes unbounded.

The name refers to Pascal's Wager, but unlike the wager, it does not require infinite rewards. This sidesteps many objections to the Pascal's Wager dilemma that are based on the nature of infinity.

== Problem statement ==
The term "Pascal's mugging" to refer to this problem was originally coined by Eliezer Yudkowsky in the LessWrong forum. Philosopher Nick Bostrom later elaborated the thought experiment in the form of a fictional dialogue. Subsequently, other authors published their own sequels to the events of this first dialogue, adopting the same literary style.

In Bostrom's description, Blaise Pascal is accosted by a mugger who has forgotten their weapon. However, the mugger proposes a deal: the philosopher gives them his wallet, and in exchange the mugger will return twice the amount of money tomorrow. Pascal declines, pointing out that it is unlikely the deal will be honoured. The mugger then continues naming higher rewards, pointing out that even if it is just one chance in 1000 that they will be honourable, it would make sense for Pascal to make a deal for a 2000 times return. Pascal responds that the probability of that high return is even lower than one in 1000. The mugger argues back that for any low but strictly greater than 0 probability of being able to pay back a large amount of money (or pure utility) there exists a finite amount that makes it rational to take the bet. In one example, the mugger succeeds by promising Pascal 1,000 quadrillion happy days of life. Convinced by the argument, Pascal gives the mugger the wallet.

In one of Yudkowsky's examples, the mugger succeeds by saying "give me five dollars, or I'll use my magic powers from outside the Matrix to run a Turing machine that simulates and kills $3\uparrow\uparrow\uparrow\uparrow3$ people". Here, the number $3\uparrow\uparrow\uparrow\uparrow3$ uses Knuth's up-arrow notation; writing the number out in base 10 would require enormously more writing material than there are atoms in the known universe.

The supposed paradox results from two inconsistent views. On the one side, by multiplying an expected utility calculation, assuming loss of five dollars to be valued at $f$, loss of a life to be valued at $l$, and probability that the mugger is telling the truth at $t$, the solution is to give the money if and only if $(3 \uparrow \uparrow \uparrow \uparrow 3)\times t \times l > f$. Assuming that $l$ is higher than $f$, so long as $t$ is higher than $1 / (3\uparrow\uparrow\uparrow\uparrow3)$, which is assumed to be true, (Note: While it may seem very intuitive that the probability t cannot be as small as 1/(3↑↑↑↑3), this is not necessarily true. As a notable example, it is false in Bayesian models for this problem: There, the prior probability of the mugger’s claim being correct decreases with the extraordinariness of his claim. If his claim is as extraordinary as in this case, its probability will also be extraordinarily small in a Bayesian model. Furthermore, a frequentist may estimate the probability of the mugger's threat being realized as equal to 0, since no realization of such an extraordinary threat has ever been observed.) it is considered rational to pay the mugger. On the other side of the argument, paying the mugger is intuitively irrational due to its exploitability. If the person being mugged agrees to this sequence of logic, then they can be exploited repeatedly for all of their money, resulting in a Dutch-book, which is typically considered irrational. Views on which of these arguments is logically correct differ.

Moreover, in many reasonable-seeming decision systems, Pascal's mugging causes the expected utility of any action to fail to converge, as an unlimited chain of successively dire scenarios similar to Pascal's mugging would need to be factored in.

Some of the arguments concerning this paradox affect not only the expected utility maximization theory, but may also apply to other theoretical systems, such as consequentialist ethics, for example. (Note: A "consequentialist version" of Pascal's mugging was proposed by Bradley Monton as follows: A strange person hands you a baby and asks you to torture it, telling you that the torture will prevent significant unjust suffering of a large number of sentient creatures in some distant galaxy. While the probability is very low that torturing the baby will prevent the suffering, as long as the strange person makes the number of claimed distant-galaxy creatures high enough, according to consequentialism equipped with probabilistic models in which the probability that the torturing prevents the suffering does not decrease if the number of galaxies is increased (notably Bayesian models do have a decreasing probability for increasing numbers of galaxies because the prior will necessarily concentrate around some fixed number of galaxies), you should torture the baby.)

== Consequences and remedies ==
Philosopher Nick Bostrom argues that Pascal's mugging, like Pascal's wager, suggests that giving a superintelligent artificial intelligence a flawed decision theory could be disastrous. Pascal's mugging may also be relevant when considering low-probability, high-stakes events such as existential risk or charitable interventions with a low probability of success but extremely high rewards. Common sense seems to suggest that spending effort on too unlikely scenarios is irrational.

One advocated remedy might be to only use bounded utility functions: rewards cannot be arbitrarily large. Another approach is to use Bayesian reasoning to (qualitatively) judge the quality of evidence and probability estimates rather than naively calculate expectations. Other approaches are to penalize the prior probability of hypotheses that argue that we are in a surprisingly unique position to affect large numbers of other people who cannot symmetrically affect us, (Note: This 'leverage penalty' was first proposed by Robin Hanson in a comment on Yudkowsky's original statement of the problem; Yudkowsky noted that this would imply refusing to believe in theories implying we can affect vastly many others, even in the face of what might otherwise look like overwhelming observational evidence for the theory.) reject providing the probability of a payout first, or abandon quantitative decision procedures in the presence of extremely large risks.

== See also ==
- Decision theory
- Expected utility
- Longtermism
- Scope neglect
- St. Petersburg paradox

== Sources ==
- Balfour, Dylan (2021). "Pascal's Mugger Strikes Again". Utilitas. 33 (1): 118–124. doi:10.1017/s0953820820000357. S2CID 229475903.
- Bostrom, Nick (2009). "Pascal's mugging" (PDF). Analysis (journal). 69 (3): 443–445. doi:10.1093/analys/anp062. JSTOR 40607655.
- Häggström, Olle (2016). Here Be Dragons: Science, Technology and the Future of Humanity. Oxford University Press. doi:10.1093/acprof:oso/9780198723547.001.0001. ISBN 978-0-19-872354-7.
- Russell, Jeffrey Sanford (December 2022). "Planning for Pascal's Mugging" (PDF). PhilPapers.
- Yudkowsky, Eliezer (19 October 2007). "Pascal's Mugging: Tiny Probabilities of Vast Utilities". LessWrong.
