= If Anyone Builds It, Everyone Dies =

2025 book about artificial intelligence

If Anyone Builds It, Everyone Dies: Why Superhuman AI Would Kill Us All
- Author: Eliezer Yudkowsky and Nate Soares
- Subject: Existential risk from artificial intelligence
- Publisher: Little, Brown and Company
- Publication date: 16 September 2025
- Pages: 256
- ISBN: 9780316595643

If Anyone Builds It, Everyone Dies: Why Superhuman AI Would Kill Us All (published in the UK with the alternative subtitle The Case Against Superintelligent AI) is a 2025 book by Eliezer Yudkowsky and Nate Soares that details potential threats posed to humanity by artificial superintelligence.

The book was published by Little, Brown and Company, and appeared in The New York Times Best Seller list on October 5, 2025.

== Synopsis ==
As explained by Yudkowsky and Soares, unlike traditional software that consists of code created by humans, modern AI models are primarily neural networks with hundreds of billions to trillions of numerical parameters called weights that result from training and whose functions are opaque to researchers. When an AI model threatens a New York Times reporter, or calls itself "MechaHitler", developers cannot directly fix it, because the issue originates from illegible numerical parameters rather than code.

People can train AI systems to be generally competent. An AI that tries to achieve goals will perform better on many metrics, so it will be selected for by the training process. According to the authors, modern machine learning does not allow people to specify the goals that a superintelligent AI system should pursue, and the AI's goals are "vanishingly unlikely" to be aligned with human values.

Yudkowsky and Soares argue that just as people lose at chess to Stockfish, they would lose to an AI system that is generally more competent than they are. It is hard to predict the exact path, as that would mean being as good at achieving goals as the AI system, but there are some. Superintelligence would not care about people, but it would want the resources they need. Humanity would thus lose and go extinct.

The book's authors contend that the world's leaders, the scientific community, and everyone else should speak up and warn the world about the danger. To avoid catastrophe, the authors believe humanity must coordinate to halt large-scale general AI development everywhere, possibly with an exception for narrow AI systems like AlphaFold that would not threaten humanity's existence.

== Reception ==
The book's critical reviews are mixed.

Upon its release, it was included in the New York Times best-seller lists for hardcover nonfiction and for combined print and e-books nonfiction.

In The New York Times, Stephen Marche compared the book to a Scientology manual and said reading it was like being trapped in a room with irritating college students on their first mushroom trip.

The New Yorker included it in its list of The Best Books of the Year So Far.

The Guardian called it one of the biggest books of the autumn, one of the best science and nature books of 2025, and the September 22, 2025, Book of the Day, writing that superintelligent AI is dangerous but steps can still be taken to avert disaster. The Guardian's nonfiction books editor David Shariatmadari wrote, "If Anyone Builds It, Everyone Dies is as clear as its conclusions are hard to swallow" and that anyone who cares about the future should read its arguments. In a Best Books of the Year list, Anjana Ahuja called the book "surprisingly readable and chillingly plausible": "Not exactly cheery Christmas reading but, as the machines literally calculate our demise, you'll finally grasp all that tech bro lingo about tokens, weights and maximising preferences."

Tom Whipple, the Science editor at The Times, called the book compelling and disturbing, noting its readability and engaging storytelling, which at times resembled a thriller, "albeit one where the thrills come from the obliteration of literally everything of value". While finding the authors' astonishing and dire claims credible, he expressed hope that they are wrong due to the apocalyptic outcome, one he could see no way to avoid.

Kevin Canfield wrote in the San Francisco Chronicle that the book makes powerful arguments and recommended it.

In The Atlantic, Adam Becker wrote that the book is "tendentious and rambling, simultaneously condescending and shallow. Yudkowsky and Soares are earnest; unlike many of the loudest prognosticators around AI, they are not grifters. They are just wrong...Yudkowsky and Soares fail to make an evidence-based scientific case for their claims."

In an article titled "Why we must pull the plug on superintelligence", Paul Wood wrote for The Spectator: "If more and more people understand the danger, wake up and decide to end the 'suicide race', our fate is still in our own hands. If Anyone Builds It, Everyone Dies is an important book. We should consider its arguments – while we still can."

Publishers Weekly called the book an "urgent clarion call to prevent the creation of artificial superintelligence" and a "frightening warning that deserves to be reckoned with", but wrote that some of its parables and analogies are less effective than others and that very few opposing viewpoints are presented.

Kirkus Reviews gave a positive review, calling the book "a timely and terrifying education on the galloping havoc AI could unleash—unless we grasp the reins and take control."

Booklist gave the book a starred review. It praised Yudkowsky and Soares for their analysis of the existential threats posed by artificial superintelligence. It called the book a "fire alarm" for anyone involved in shaping the future, emphasizing that it demands serious consideration and reflection from all stakeholders no matter their opinion of its conclusions.

In Wired, Steven Levy expressed skepticism about the likelihood that AI will cause human extinction. He also found the authors' proposals for preventing devastation more improbable than "the idea that software will murder us all", but added, "still, the catastrophe theory doesn’t seem impossible", mentioned a study of AI contemplating blackmail, and concluded, "My gut tells me the scenarios Yudkowsky and Soares spin are too bizarre to be true. But I can't be sure they are wrong."

The New Zealand Herald called it the book of the day on October 21, 2025, writing, "How many chances do you want to take with the future of our species?"

For The Observer, Ian Leslie wrote that the authors tell their story with "clarity, verve, and barely suppressed glee", making it "a lot of fun" for a book about human extinction. But he was not convinced that superintelligence as described is imminent, or that if it emerges, it will likely lead to humanity's demise.

In The Times Literary Supplement, Gary Marcus wrote, "Things are worrying, but not nearly as worrying as the authors suggest" and that the authors "lay out this thesis thoughtfully, entertainingly, earnestly, provocatively and doggedly. Yet their book is also deeply flawed. It deserves to be read with an immense amount of salt."

For New Scientist, Jacob Aron called the book "extremely readable" but added, "the problem is that, while compelling, the argument is fatally flawed", concluding that effort would be better spent on "problems of science fact" like climate change.

In the effective altruist journal Asterisk Magazine, Clara Collier called the book less coherent than the authors' earlier work and said it does not fully explain its premises.

In The Washington Post, Grace Byron called the book a polemic with vague instructions rather than a manual. She concluded that while its authors are experts on its subject matter, the book feels like it was written by "two aggrieved patriarchs tired of being ignored".

In the New Statesman, Gareth Watkins wrote, "If Anyone Builds It, Everyone Dies is not a serious book" and "Yudkowsky's legacy has not been to save the world, but to make it cheaper, sillier, and more Online".

== See also ==
- Machine Intelligence Research Institute
- PauseAI
- Statement on AI Extinction Risk
