= Stovepiping =

Presenting information without proper context

In intelligence gathering, stovepiping is the presentation of information without proper context. It can be caused by the specialized nature or security requirements of a particular intelligence-collection technology. Alternatively, the lack of context may come from a particular group in the national policy structure that chooses to present only information that supports certain conclusions. An example would be how money funded for research is not evenly allocated but instead goes toward one specific ailment remedy.

The definition of stovepiping can also refer to sharing information within a governmental body while hindering the sharing of information across different government bodies. This type of information sharing can create large ineffectiveness as coordination can be weak, leading to a variety of inefficiencies and delays particularly with daily communication across governmental bodies. However, this issue can often be solved when groups or certain governmental entities can pressure or require different governmental bodies to work together.

== Collection technologies ==
According to a staff study for the United States House Permanent Select Committee on Intelligence, in the 104th Congress (1995-1997), "The most common criticism of the current collection management process, and one in which we concur, is that it is dominated by 'stovepipes,' i.e., types of collection that are managed so as to be largely distinct from one another."

The most common types of intelligence collection, and to some extent processing, which are commonly found in "stovepipes", include signal intelligence (SIGINT), imagery intelligence (IMINT), and human intelligence (HUMINT). While there are other forms of sensitive intelligence collection, these "big three", in a proper use, complement one another. A SIGINT communications intercept, for example, may suggest the presence of a particular military unit in a given location. For example, as part of the Operation Quicksilver deception plan during World War II, dummy communications were generated for the fictitious First United States Army Group (FUSAG), ostensibly commanded by George Patton, in order to convince the Germans that the main attack would come at the Pas-de-Calais, rather than the real target of Normandy. Dummy equipment was positioned in the places consistent with the communications, and a very few German high-altitude photographic aircraft brought back evidence apparently confirming IMINT. The British, however, had jailed or turned all German HUMINT spies, through the Double Cross System. Had a real spy been able to get to a FUSAG location, he would have seen the tanks were inflatable rubber decoys. The British, however, allowed only false confirmations of real tanks to be sent.

== Stovepiping in global health ==
The use of the term "stovepiping" has also been used in relation to global health for many years now. It refers to the misallocation of funds from donors to organizations in response to a certain disease. This occurs when the interests of the donors are considered instead of the interests of the recipients and as a result money is funneled into specific areas of a given health care system instead of the being used to tackle a larger issue. This is particularly evident through the aid that has been provided to Africa in relation to HIV/AIDS, despite not being one of the top three causes of death on the continent. As a result, it is seen to meet the moral demands of the donors and not the recipients of the aid.

== Before and after 9/11 ==
Another meaning of stovepiping is "piping" of raw intelligence data directly to decision makers, bypassing established procedures for review by professional intelligence analysts for validity (a process known as vetting), an important concern since the information may have been presented by a dishonest source with ulterior motives, or may be invalid for a myriad of other reasons. For example, numerous articles and books have subsequently appeared to detail how conflicts between the Bush administration and the intelligence community marred the reporting on Iraq’s weapons.

Some believe that one reason that "warning signs" of the terrorists attacks on September 11, 2001 were not acted upon effectively was a longstanding compartmentalization and duplication of intelligence gathering and sharing at the federal, state, and local levels. The 9/11 Commission noted that "lines of operational authority run to the expanding executive departments, and they are guarded for understandable reasons: the DCI commands the CIA’s personnel overseas; the Secretary of Defense will not yield to others in conveying commands to military forces; the Justice Department will not give up the responsibility of deciding whether to seek arrest warrants. But the result is that each agency or department needs its own intelligence apparatus to support the performance of its duties."

The Office of Special Plans (OSP), created by the George W. Bush administration, is credited with stovepiping raw intelligence related to Saddam Hussein's government in Iraq to high-level Bush administration officials. Media analysis and professional analysts from other US government departments subsequently determined that many of the reports originated with dishonest sources or were untrue for other reasons (see Curveball), and the process of vetting would have prevented their reaching decision makers through normal channels. As one report stated, "The 2003 Iraq prewar intelligence failure was not simply a case of the U.S. intelligence community providing flawed data to policy-makers. It also involved subversion of the competitive intelligence analysis process, where unofficial intelligence boutiques 'stovepiped' misleading intelligence assessments directly to policy-makers and undercut intelligence community input that ran counter to the White House's preconceived preventive war of choice against Iraq." The stovepiping by the OSP had the effect of providing a substantial portion of the untrue allegations that formed the publicly declared justifications for the 2003 Invasion of Iraq, such as allegations of collaboration with Al Qaeda and an ongoing program of weapons of mass destruction.

A government-published document which refers to "stove-piping" concerned the attacks in the American Consulate in Benghazi, Libya in 2012. The report, Accountability Review Board for Benghazi to Examine the Facts and Circumstances Surrounding the Attacks of September 11–12, 2012 was promulgated in declassified status. One of the two references to stove-piping states that "in the months leading up to September 11, 2012, security in Benghazi was not recognized and implemented as a 'shared responsibility' in Washington, resulting in stove-piped discussions and decisions on policy and security."

== China ==
China faces a large issue of different individual hierarchies that don’t collaborate with each other. Instead they stove-pipe the information up within their hierarchy, before the information is passed, if at all, on to a different agency. Part of the cause of this stove-piping can be seen as arising from the competition between different governmental bodies, but also within the bodies. With different governmental bodies fighting for greater power, often at the expense of another governmental body, there is a greater incentive not to share information with other governmental bodies. Additionally, there is competition to get acknowledgment from higher-ups within one's hierarchy, which encourages sharing information up the governmental-body hierarchy rather than across to a inter-related but distinctly separate governmental-body that one is less associated with. The Chinese Communist Party (CCP) has some means to alleviate this stove-piping being spurred by competition. For example, Leading Small Groups (LSGs) have coordinating power, but are limited in their scope of what they are willing to coordinate between governmental bodies.

This stove-piping has implications beyond just inefficiencies for the CCP; dependence on LSGs for coordination can help centralize power within the party-elite, as the General Secretary and other high-level party officials can head these LSGs. Despite centralizing power within the CCP, it’s unclear if the benefits of centralization of power from LSGs could possibly offset the costs and inefficiencies caused by stove-piping.

== See also ==
- Information silo – Insular information management system
- Institutional memory – Collective set of facts, concepts, experiences and knowledge held by a group of people
- Malinformation – Factual information disseminated with harmful intention
