= The Intelligence Explosion =

2025 book by James Barrat

- Author: James Barrat
- Publisher: St. Martin's Press
- Publication date: September 16, 2025
- Pages: 336
- ISBN: 978-1-250-35502-7

The Intelligence Explosion: When AI Beats Humans at Everything is a 2025 book by American documentary filmmaker, speaker, and author James Barrat which explores the rise of generative artificial intelligence and its current and potential impact on humanity.
