= Letter from Utopia =

2008 epistolary essay by Nick Bostrom

"Letter from Utopia" is a fictional letter written by philosopher Nick Bostrom in 2008. It depicts, what Bostrom describes as, "A vision of the future, from the future". In the essay, a posthuman in the far future writes to humanity in the deep past, describing how wonderful their utopian existence is and encouraging their ancestors to do everything they can to make their future possible. This includes conquering aging, sickness, and death, increasing human intelligence, and eliminating suffering in pursuit of pleasure. The essay is considered a manifesto of transhumanism.
