= Reversal test =

Heuristic designed to spot and eliminate status quo bias

The reversal test is a heuristic designed to spot and eliminate status quo bias, an emotional bias irrationally favouring the current state of affairs. The test is applicable to the evaluation of any decision involving a potential deviation from the status quo along some continuous dimension. The reversal test was introduced in the context of the bioethics of human enhancement by Nick Bostrom and Toby Ord.

== Concept ==
Bostrom and Ord introduced the reversal test to provide an answer to the question of how one can, given that humans might suffer from irrational status quo bias, distinguish between valid criticisms of a proposed increase in some human trait and criticisms merely motivated by resistance to change. The reversal test attempts to do this by asking whether it would be a good thing if the trait was decreased: An example given is that if someone objects that an increase in intelligence would be a bad thing due to more dangerous weapons being made etc., the objector to that position would then ask "Shouldn't we decrease intelligence then?"

"Reversal Test: When a proposal to change a certain parameter is thought to have bad overall consequences, consider a change to the same parameter in the opposite direction. If this is also thought to have bad overall consequences, then the onus is on those who reach these conclusions to explain why our position cannot be improved through changes to this parameter. If they are unable to do so, then we have reason to suspect that they suffer from status quo bias." (p. 664)

Ideally, the test will help reveal whether status quo bias is an important causal factor in the initial judgement.

A similar thought experiment in regards to dampening traumatic memories was described by Adam J. Kolber, imagining whether aliens naturally resistant to traumatic memories should adopt traumatic "memory enhancement". The "trip to reality" rebuttal to Nozick's experience machine thought experiment (where one's entire current life is shown to be a simulation and one is offered to return to reality) can also be seen as a form of reversal test.

== Double reversal test ==
A further elaboration on the reversal test is suggested as the double reversal test:

"Double Reversal Test: Suppose it is thought that increasing a certain parameter and decreasing it would both have bad overall consequences. Consider a scenario in which a natural factor threatens to move the parameter in one direction and ask whether it would be good to counterbalance this change by an intervention to preserve the status quo. If so, consider a later time when the naturally occurring factor is about to vanish and ask whether it would be a good idea to intervene to reverse the first intervention. If not, then there is a strong prima facie case for thinking that it would be good to make the first intervention even in the absence of the natural countervailing factor." (p. 673)

An example may be the parameter of life expectancy, moving in the downward direction because of a sudden natural disease. People might intervene to invest in better health infrastructure to preserve the current life expectancy. If the disease is then cured, the double reversal test asks: should the investment be reversed to defund the health services created for the disease now that it is gone? If not, the argument proposes that people should invest in health infrastructure even if there never is a disease in the first place. In this case, the status quo bias is turned against itself, greatly reducing its impact on the reasoning. It also purports to handle arguments of evolutionary adaptation, transition costs, risk, and societal ethics that can counter the other test.

Christian Weidemann has noted that although sometimes useful, the double reversal test can muddy the water, because guaranteeing and weighing transition costs versus benefits might be the relevant practical ethical question for much human enhancement analysis.
