= Malinformation =

Factual information disseminated with harmful intention

Malinformation is information that is based on fact, but removed from its original context to mislead, harm, or manipulate. Whether something should be considered malinformation can therefore contain an element of subjectivity, and it is therefore a controversial concept. Proponents of the term argue that malinformation is often used in conjunction with disinformation and misinformation as part of "orchestrated campaigns [to] spread untruths", a phenomenon known as fake news. Critics believe the concept can be used to censor dissenting opinions.

== History ==
The term was first coined by Hossein Derakhshan and was used in a co-authored report titled "Information Disorder: Toward an interdisciplinary framework for research and policy making". According to Derakhshan, examples of malinformation can include "revenge porn, where the change of context from private to public is the sign of malicious intent", or providing false information about where and when a photograph was taken in order to mislead the viewer (the picture is real, but the meta-information and its context is changed).

== Criticism ==
Critics of the term malinformation argue that "unlike 'disinformation,' which is intentionally misleading, or 'misinformation,' which is erroneous, 'malinformation' is true but inconvenient". Journalists have raised concerns that terms such as malinformation expand the definition of "harmful content" to encompass true information that supports non-mainstream views, resulting in people who hold dissenting viewpoints being censored and silenced even if those views are substantiated.

== See also ==
- Hate speech
- Infohazard
- Stovepiping
- Thoughtcrime
