= Nate Soares =

American author and researcher

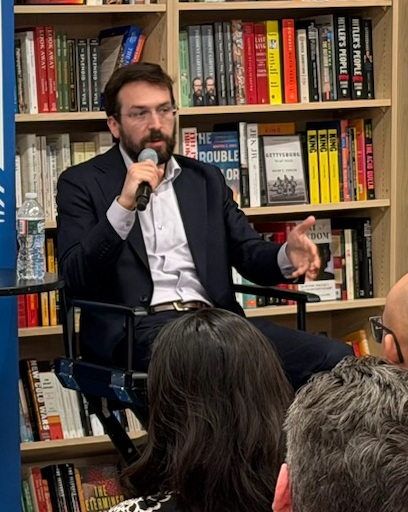
- Soares in 2025
- Born: 1989 (age 36–37)
- Education: George Washington University (BS)
- Occupations: AI safety researcher, author
- Known for: AI alignment, AI existential risk
- Works: If Anyone Builds It, Everyone Dies (2025)
- Title: President of the Machine Intelligence Research Institute
- Website: mindingourway.com

Nathaniel Soares is an American author and artificial intelligence (AI) researcher known for his work on existential risk from AI. In 2014, Soares co-authored "Corrigibility", a paper published in the proceedings of a 2015 AAAI workshop. Soares and Eliezer Yudkowsky say the paper introduced the term AI alignment problem, referring to the challenge of making increasingly capable AI systems behave as intended. Soares is the president of the Machine Intelligence Research Institute (MIRI), a nonprofit research organization based in Berkeley, California.

In 2025, Soares co-authored If Anyone Builds It, Everyone Dies with Eliezer Yudkowsky. In the book, the authors argue that creating AI far more capable than humans (superintelligence), “using anything remotely like current techniques”, would very likely result in human extinction. They further contend that AI alignment research remains at an early stage and that international regulation will likely be required to prevent developers from racing to build systems that the authors say could be catastrophically dangerous. The book appeared in The New York Times Best Seller list on October 5, 2025.

== Life and career ==
Soares received his Bachelor of Science degree in computer science and economics from George Washington University in 2011. Soares worked as a research associate at the National Institute of Standards and Technology and as a contractor for the United States Department of Defense, creating software tools for the National Defense University, before working at Microsoft and Google.

Soares left Google in 2014 to become a research fellow at the Machine Intelligence Research Institute. He was the lead author of MIRI's research agenda, which in January 2015 was cited in Research Priorities for Robust and Beneficial Artificial Intelligence, a paper accompanying an open letter calling for AI scientists to prioritize technical research “not only on making AI more capable, but also on maximizing the societal benefit of AI.” The paper's priorities included “research on the possibility of superintelligent machines or rapid, sustained self-improvement (intelligence explosion).”

In 2015, Soares became the institute's executive director, succeeding Luke Muehlhauser. In 2017, he gave a talk at Google outlining open research problems in AI alignment and arguing that the alignment problem was especially difficult.

In 2023, MIRI shifted its focus from alignment research toward warning policymakers and the public about the risks posed by potential future developments in AI, while continuing to support technical research. Coinciding with this change, Soares moved from executive director to president, while Malo Bourgon became MIRI's CEO.

In 2025, Soares told The Atlantic that he was focusing more on public awareness than technical research, arguing that AI development was advancing too quickly for adequate safeguards to be put in place.

== Publications ==
- Garrabrant, Scott; Benson-Tilsen, Tsvi; Critch, Andrew; Soares, Nate; Taylor, Jessica (2017). "A Formal Approach to the Problem of Logical Non-Omniscience". Proceedings Sixteenth Conference on Theoretical Aspects of Rationality and Knowledge. pp. 221–235.
- Soares, Nate (2018). "The Value Learning Problem" (PDF). In Yampolskiy, Roman (ed.). Artificial Intelligence Safety and Security. Chapman & Hall. ISBN 9780815369820.
- Soares, Nate; Fallenstein, Benya (2017). "Agent Foundations for Aligning Machine Intelligence with Human Interests: A Technical Research Agenda" (PDF). In Callaghan, Victor; Miller, James; Yampolskiy, Roman; Armstrong, Stuart (eds.). The Technological Singularity. Springer. ISBN 9783662540312.
- Soares, Nate; Fallenstein, Benja; Yudkowsky, Eliezer; Armstrong, Stuart (2015). "Corrigibility" (PDF). AAAI Workshops: Workshops at the Twenty-Ninth AAAI Conference on Artificial Intelligence, Austin, TX, January 25–26, 2015. AAAI Publications. pp. 74–82.
- Soares, Nate; Levinstein, Benjamin (2020). "Cheating Death in Damascus" (PDF). The Journal of Philosophy. 117 (5): 237–266. doi:10.5840/jphil2020117516.
- Yudkowsky, Eliezer; Soares, Nate (2025). If Anyone Builds It, Everyone Dies: Why Superhuman AI Would Kill Us All. Little, Brown and Company. ISBN 9780316595643.
