= James Barrat =

American documentary filmmaker, speaker, and author

- Born: James Rodman Barrat; 1960 (age 65–66); United States
- Occupations: Documentary filmmaker, author, speaker
- Years active: 1980s–present
- Known for: Our Final Invention: Artificial Intelligence and the End of the Human Era; documentary filmmaking
- Notable work: Our Final Invention; The Intelligence Explosion: When AI Beats Humans at Everything; Rise of the Black Pharaohs; The Gospel of Judas; Herod's Lost Tomb

James Rodman Barrat (born 1960) is an American documentary filmmaker, speaker, and author of the nonfiction book Our Final Invention: Artificial Intelligence and the End of the Human Era.

== Career ==
Barrat’s career began as a writer. He had two stage plays produced while in his 20s. His first broadcast job was documentary scriptwriting for National Geographic Television.

He now writes, directs, and produces documentary film. Broadcasters have included the National Geographic Channel, PBS NOVA, the BBC, the Discovery Channel, the History Channel, Animal Planet, the Travel Channel, and The Learning Channel. Barrat has created dozens of documentaries and worked in over 70 countries.

Among his films, Barrat wrote, produced, and directed the 2014 National Geographic film ‘’Rise of the Black Pharaohs’’. Barrat also is the producer of the 2015 documentary Rise: The Promise of My Brother's Keeper airing in June 2015 on the Discovery Channel and OWN.

In 2010, Barrat was the producer and director for the PBS NOVA documentary "Extreme Cave Diving." The filmmaker cowrote, directed, and produced the documentary special The Gospel of Judas, which aired in 2006 with high ratings for the National Geographic Channel.

Barrat cowrote and produced the 2008 National Geographic Television documentary special Herod's Lost Tomb He also directed and produced the National Geographic documentaries Lost Treasures of Afghanistan and Secrets of Jerusalem's Holiest Sites. He is interviewed in the 2018 documentary on artificial intelligence Do You Trust This Computer?

St. Martin's Press released Barrat's book The Intelligence Explosion: When AI Beats Humans at Everything on September 2, 2025.

== Book reception ==
Barrat began writing Our Final Invention in 2010. It was published in 2013.

In 2014, Time magazine identified Barrat as one of the "5 Very Smart People Who Think Artificial Intelligence Could Bring the Apocalypse". Barrat's book was named one of eight "Definitive Tech Books of 2013" by The Huffington Post. He has been interviewed about artificial intelligence by CNN News and the BBC World Service Business Daily.

== Personal life ==
Barrat is married and has two children. He is a 1983 graduate of Davidson College with a B.A. in philosophy.
