= Nick Bostrom =

Philosopher and writer (born 1973)

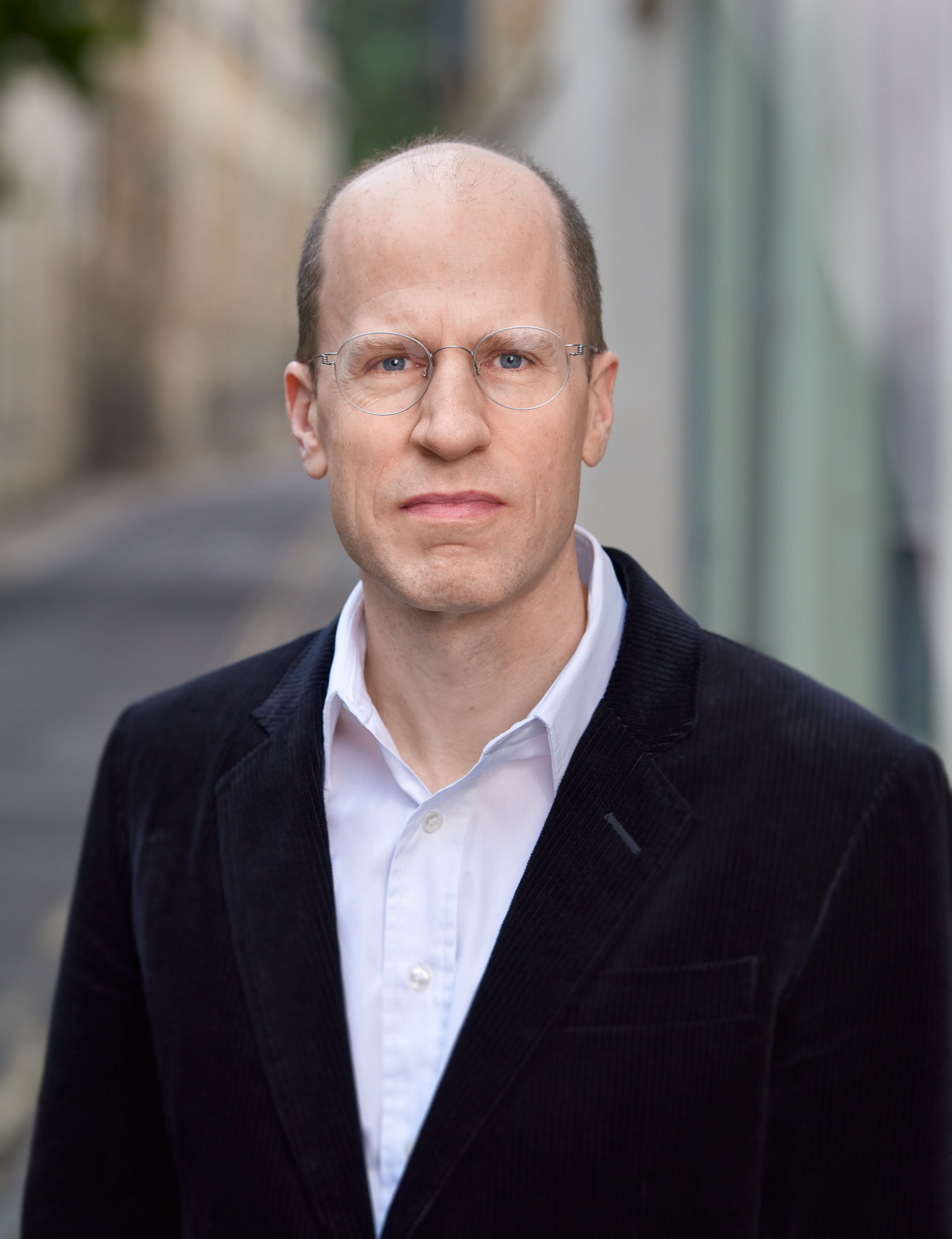
- Bostrom in 2020
- Born: Niklas Boström; 10 March 1973 (age 53); Helsingborg, Sweden
- Spouse: Susan

Education
- Education: University of Gothenburg (BA); Stockholm University (MA); King's College London (MSc); London School of Economics (PhD)
- Thesis: Observational Selection Effects and Probability (2000)
- Doctoral advisor: Colin Howson; Craig Callender

Philosophical work
- Era: Contemporary philosophy
- Region: Western philosophy
- School: Analytic philosophy
- Institutions: Yale University; University of Oxford; Future of Humanity Institute
- Main interests: Philosophy of artificial intelligence Bioethics
- Notable ideas: Anthropic bias Reversal test Simulation hypothesis Vulnerable world hypothesis Existential risk studies Singleton; Ancestor simulation Information hazard Infinitarian paralysis Self-indication assumption Self-sampling assumption
- Website: nickbostrom.com

Niklas Boström (Note: /ˈbɒstrəm/ BOST-rəm; Swedish: Niklas Boström [ˈnɪ̌kːlas ˈbûːstrœm]) (born 10 March 1973) is a Swedish philosopher known for his work on existential risk, the anthropic principle, human enhancement ethics, whole brain emulation, risks from artificial intelligence, and the reversal test. He was the founding director of the later defunct Future of Humanity Institute at the University of Oxford and is currently Principal Researcher at his own Macrostrategy Research Initiative.

Bostrom is the author of Anthropic Bias: Observation Selection Effects in Science and Philosophy (2002), Superintelligence: Paths, Dangers, Strategies (2014) and Deep Utopia: Life and Meaning in a Solved World (2024). In 2008 and 2009, he co-edited two books titled Global Catastrophic Risks and Human Enhancement.

Bostrom believes that advances in artificial intelligence (AI) may lead to superintelligence, which he defines as "any intellect that greatly exceeds the cognitive performance of humans in virtually all domains of interest". He views this as a major source of opportunities and existential risks.

== Early life and education ==
Born as Niklas Boström in 1973 in Helsingborg, Sweden, he disliked school at a young age and spent his last year of high school learning from home. He was interested in a wide variety of academic areas, including anthropology, art, literature, and science.

He received a B.A. degree from the University of Gothenburg in 1994. He then earned an M.A. degree in philosophy and physics from Stockholm University and an MSc degree in computational neuroscience from King's College London in 1996. During his time at Stockholm University, he researched the relationship between language and reality by studying the analytic philosopher W. V. Quine. He also did some turns on London's stand-up comedy circuit.

In 2000, he was awarded a PhD degree in philosophy from the London School of Economics under the supervision of Colin Howson and Craig Callender. His thesis was titled Observational selection effects and probability. He held a teaching position at Yale University from 2000 to 2002, and was a British Academy Postdoctoral Fellow at the University of Oxford from 2002 to 2005.

== Research and writing ==
=== Existential risk ===
Bostrom's research concerns the future of humanity and long-term outcomes. He discusses existential risk, which he defines as one in which an "adverse outcome would either annihilate Earth-originating intelligent life or permanently and drastically curtail its potential". Bostrom is mostly concerned about anthropogenic risks, which are risks arising from human activities, particularly from new technologies such as advanced artificial intelligence, molecular nanotechnology, or synthetic biology.

In 2005, Bostrom founded the Future of Humanity Institute which, until its shutdown in 2024, researched the far future of human civilization. He is also an adviser to the Centre for the Study of Existential Risk.

In the 2008 essay collection, Global Catastrophic Risks, editors Bostrom and Milan M. Ćirković characterize the relationship between existential risk and the broader class of global catastrophic risks, and link existential risk to observer selection effects and the Fermi paradox.

==== Vulnerable world hypothesis ====
In a paper called "The Vulnerable World Hypothesis", Bostrom suggests that there may be some technologies that destroy human civilization by default (Note: Bostrom says that the risk can be reduced if society sufficiently exits what he calls a "semi-anarchic default condition", which roughly means limited capabilities for preventive policing and global governance, and having individuals with diverse motivations.) when discovered. Bostrom proposes a framework for classifying and dealing with these vulnerabilities. He also gives counterfactual thought experiments of how such vulnerabilities could have historically occurred, e.g. if nuclear weapons had been easier to develop or had ignited the atmosphere (as Edward Teller had feared).

=== Digital sentience ===
Bostrom supports the substrate independence principle, the idea that consciousness can emerge on various types of physical substrates, not only in "carbon-based biological neural networks" like the human brain. He considers that "sentience is a matter of degree" and that digital minds can in theory be engineered to have a much higher rate and intensity of subjective experience than humans, using less resources. Such highly sentient machines, which he calls "super-beneficiaries", would be extremely efficient at achieving happiness. He recommends finding "paths that will enable digital minds and biological minds to coexist, in a mutually beneficial way where all of these different forms can flourish and thrive".

=== Anthropic reasoning ===
Bostrom has published numerous articles on anthropic reasoning, as well as the book Anthropic Bias: Observation Selection Effects in Science and Philosophy. In the book, he criticizes previous formulations of the anthropic principle, including those of Brandon Carter, John Leslie, John Barrow, and Frank Tipler.

Bostrom believes that the mishandling of indexical information is a common flaw in many areas of inquiry (including cosmology, philosophy, evolution theory, game theory, and quantum physics). He argues that an anthropic theory is needed to deal with these. He introduces the self-sampling assumption (SSA) and analyzes the self-indication assumption (SIA), shows how they lead to different conclusions in a number of cases, and identifies how each is affected by paradoxes or counterintuitive implications in certain thought experiments. He argues against SIA and proposes refining SSA into the strong self-sampling assumption (SSSA), which replaces "observers" in the SSA definition with "observer-moments".

In later work, he proposed with Milan M. Ćirković and Anders Sandberg the phenomenon of anthropic shadow, an observation selection effect that prevents observers from observing certain kinds of catastrophes in their recent geological and evolutionary past. They suggest that events that lie in the anthropic shadow are likely to be underestimated unless statistical corrections are made.

==== Simulation argument ====
Bostrom's simulation argument posits that at least one of the following statements is very likely to be true:

1. The fraction of human-level civilizations that reach a posthuman stage is very close to zero;
2. The fraction of posthuman civilizations that are interested in running ancestor-simulations is very close to zero;
3. The fraction of all people with our kind of experiences that are living in a simulation is very close to one.

=== Ethics of human enhancement ===
Bostrom is favorably disposed toward "human enhancement", or "self-improvement and human perfectibility through the ethical application of science", as well as a critic of bio-conservative views.

In 1998, Bostrom co-founded (with David Pearce) the World Transhumanist Association (which has since changed its name to Humanity+). In 2004, he co-founded (with James Hughes) the Institute for Ethics and Emerging Technologies, although he is no longer involved with either of these organisations.

In 2005, Bostrom published the short story "The Fable of the Dragon-Tyrant" in the Journal of Medical Ethics. A shorter version was published in 2012 in Philosophy Now. The fable personifies death as a dragon that demands a tribute of thousands of people every day. The story explores how status quo bias and learned helplessness can prevent people from taking action to defeat aging even when the means to do so are at their disposal. YouTuber CGP Grey created an animated version of the story.

With philosopher Toby Ord, he proposed the reversal test in 2006. Given humans' irrational status quo bias, how can one distinguish between valid criticisms of proposed changes in a human trait and criticisms merely motivated by resistance to change? The reversal test attempts to do this by asking whether it would be a good thing if the trait was altered in the opposite direction.

Bostrom's work also considers potential dysgenic effects in human populations but he thinks genetic engineering can provide a solution and that "In any case, the time-scale for human natural genetic evolution seems much too grand for such developments to have any significant effect before other developments will have made the issue moot".

=== Technology strategy ===
Bostrom has suggested that technology policy aimed at reducing existential risk should seek to influence the order in which various technological capabilities are attained, proposing the principle of differential technological development. This principle states that we ought to retard the development of dangerous technologies, particularly ones that raise the level of existential risk, and accelerate the development of beneficial technologies, particularly those that protect against the existential risks posed by nature or by other technologies.

In 2011, Bostrom founded the Oxford Martin Program on the Impacts of Future Technology.

Bostrom's theory of the unilateralist's curse has been cited as a reason for the scientific community to avoid controversial dangerous research such as reanimating pathogens.

=== Books ===
==== Superintelligence: Paths, Dangers, Strategies ====
In 2014, Bostrom published Superintelligence: Paths, Dangers, Strategies, which became a New York Times Best Seller. The book argues that superintelligence is possible and explores different types of superintelligences, their cognition, the associated risks. He also presents technical and strategic considerations on how to make it safe.

===== Characteristics of a superintelligence =====
Bostrom explores multiple possible paths to superintelligence, including whole brain emulation and human intelligence enhancement, but focuses on artificial general intelligence, explaining that electronic devices have many advantages over biological brains.

Bostrom draws a distinction between final goals and instrumental goals. A final goal is what an agent tries to achieve for its own intrinsic value. Instrumental goals are just intermediary steps towards final goals. Bostrom contends there are instrumental goals that will be shared by most sufficiently intelligent agents because they are generally useful to achieve any objective (e.g. preserving the agent's own existence or current goals, acquiring resources, improving its cognition...), this is the concept of instrumental convergence. On the other side, he writes that virtually any level of intelligence can in theory be combined with virtually any final goal (even absurd final goals, e.g. making paperclips), a concept he calls the orthogonality thesis.

He argues that an AI with the ability to improve itself might initiate an intelligence explosion, resulting (potentially rapidly) in a superintelligence. Such a superintelligence could have vastly superior capabilities, notably in strategizing, social manipulation, hacking or economic productivity. With such capabilities, a superintelligence could outwit humans and take over the world, establishing a singleton (which is "a world order in which there is at the global level a single decision-making agency" (Note: Bostrom notes that "the concept of a singleton is an abstract one: a singleton could be democracy, a tyranny, a single dominant AI, a strong set of global norms that include effective provisions for their own enforcement, or even an alien overlord—its defining characteristic being simply that it is some form of agency that can solve all major global coordination problems")) and optimizing the world according to its final goals.

Bostrom argues that giving simplistic final goals to a superintelligence could be catastrophic:

Suppose we give an A.I. the goal to make humans smile. When the A.I. is weak, it performs useful or amusing actions that cause its user to smile. When the A.I. becomes superintelligent, it realizes that there is a more effective way to achieve this goal: take control of the world and stick electrodes into the facial muscles of humans to cause constant, beaming grins.

===== Mitigating the risk =====
Bostrom explores several pathways to reduce the existential risk from AI. He emphasizes the importance of international collaboration, notably to reduce race to the bottom and AI arms race dynamics. He suggests potential techniques to help control AI, including containment, stunting AI capabilities or knowledge, narrowing the operating context (e.g. to question-answering), or "tripwires" (diagnostic mechanisms that can lead to a shutdown). But Bostrom contends that "we should not be confident in our ability to keep a superintelligent genie locked up in its bottle forever. Sooner or later, it will out". He thus suggests that in order to be safe for humanity, superintelligence must be aligned with morality or human values so that it is "fundamentally on our side". Potential AI normativity frameworks include Yudkowsky's coherent extrapolated volition (human values improved via extrapolation), moral rightness (doing what is morally right), and moral permissibility (following humanity's coherent extrapolated volition except when it's morally impermissible).

Bostrom warns that an existential catastrophe can also occur from AI being misused by humans for destructive purposes, or from humans failing to take into account the potential moral status of digital minds. Despite these risks, he says that machine superintelligence seems involved at some point in "all the plausible paths to a really great future".

===== Public reception =====
Superintelligence became a New York Times Best Seller and received positive feedback from personalities such as Stephen Hawking, Bill Gates, Elon Musk, Peter Singer and Derek Parfit. It was praised for offering clear and compelling arguments on a neglected yet important topic. It was sometimes criticized for spreading pessimism about the potential of AI, or for focusing on longterm and speculative risks. Some skeptics such as Daniel Dennett or Oren Etzioni contended that superintelligence is too far away for the risk to be significant. Yann LeCun considers that there is no existential risk, asserting that superintelligent AI will have no desire for self-preservation and that experts can be trusted to make it safe.

Raffi Khatchadourian wrote that Bostrom's book on superintelligence "is not intended as a treatise of deep originality; Bostrom's contribution is to impose the rigors of analytic philosophy on a messy corpus of ideas that emerged at the margins of academic thought."

==== Deep Utopia: Life and Meaning in a Solved World ====
In his 2024 book, Deep Utopia: Life and Meaning in a Solved World, Bostrom explores the concept of an ideal life, if humanity transitions successfully into a post-superintelligence world. Bostrom notes that the question is "not how interesting a future is to look at, but how good it is to live in." He outlines some technologies that he considers physically possible in theory and available at technological maturity, such as cognitive enhancement, reversal of aging, arbitrary sensory inputs (taste, sound...), or the precise control of motivation, mood, well-being and personality. According to him, not only machines would be better than humans at working, but they would also undermine the purpose of many leisure activities, providing extreme welfare while challenging the quest for meaning.

== Public engagement ==
Bostrom has provided policy advice and consulted for many governments and organizations. He gave evidence to the House of Lords, Select Committee on Digital Skills. He is an advisory board member for the Machine Intelligence Research Institute, Future of Life Institute, and an external advisor for the Cambridge Centre for the Study of Existential Risk.

=== 1996 email incident ===
In January 2023, Bostrom issued an apology for a 1996 listserv email he sent as a postgraduate student where he had stated that he thought "Blacks are more stupid than whites", and where he also used the word "niggers" in a description of how he thought this statement might be perceived by others. The apology, posted on his website, stated that "the invocation of a racial slur was repulsive" and that he "completely repudiate[d] this disgusting email".

The email has been described as racist in several news sources. According to Andrew Anthony of The Guardian, "The apology did little to placate Bostrom's critics, not least because he conspicuously failed to withdraw his central contention regarding race and intelligence, and seemed to make a partial defence of eugenics."

Shortly afterward, Oxford University condemned the language used in the email and started an investigation. The investigation concluded on 10 August 2023: "[W]e do not consider you to be a racist or that you hold racist views, and we consider that the apology you posted in January 2023 was sincere."

== Personal life ==
Bostrom met his wife Susan in 2002. As of 2015, she lived in Montreal and Bostrom in Oxford. They have one son.

== Selected works ==
=== Books ===
- 2002 – Anthropic Bias: Observation Selection Effects in Science and Philosophy, ISBN 0-415-93858-9
- 2008 – Global Catastrophic Risks, edited by Bostrom and Milan M. Ćirković, ISBN 978-0-19-857050-9
- 2009 – Human Enhancement, edited by Bostrom and Julian Savulescu, ISBN 0-19-929972-2
- 2014 – Superintelligence: Paths, Dangers, Strategies, ISBN 978-0-19-967811-2
- 2024 - Deep Utopia: Life and Meaning in a Solved World, ISBN 978-1646871643

=== Journal articles ===
- Bostrom, Nick (1998). "How Long Before Superintelligence?". Journal of Future Studies. 2.
- — (January 2000). "Observer-relative chances in anthropic reasoning?". Erkenntnis. 52 (1): 93–108. doi:10.1023/A:1005551304409. JSTOR 20012969. S2CID 140474848.
- — (October 2001). "The Meta-Newcomb Problem". Analysis. 61 (4): 309–310. doi:10.1111/1467-8284.00310. JSTOR 3329010.
- — (March 2002). "Existential Risks: Analyzing Human Extinction Scenarios and Related Hazards". Journal of Evolution and Technology. 9 (1).
- — (April 2003). "Are You Living in a Computer Simulation?" (PDF). Philosophical Quarterly. 53 (211): 243–255. doi:10.1111/1467-9213.00309. JSTOR 3542867.
- — (2003). "The Mysteries of Self-Locating Belief and Anthropic Reasoning" (PDF). Harvard Review of Philosophy. 11 (Spring): 59–74. doi:10.5840/harvardreview20031114.
- — (November 2003). "Astronomical Waste: The Opportunity Cost of Delayed Technological Development". Utilitas. 15 (3): 308–314. doi:10.1017/S0953820800004076. S2CID 15860897.
- — (June 2005). "In Defense of Posthuman Dignity". Bioethics. 19 (3): 202–214. doi:10.1111/j.1467-8519.2005.00437.x. PMID 16167401.
- with Tegmark, Max (December 2005). "How Unlikely is a Doomsday Catastrophe?". Nature. 438 (7069): 754. arXiv:astro-ph/0512204. Bibcode:2005Natur.438..754T. doi:10.1038/438754a. PMID 16341005. S2CID 4390013.
- — (2006). "What is a Singleton?". Linguistic and Philosophical Investigations. 5 (2): 48–54.
- with Ord, Toby (July 2006). "The Reversal Test: Eliminating Status Quo Bias in Applied Ethics" (PDF). Ethics. 116 (4): 656–680. doi:10.1086/505233. PMID 17039628. S2CID 12861892.
- with Sandberg, Anders (December 2006). "Converging Cognitive Enhancements" (PDF). Annals of the New York Academy of Sciences. 1093 (1): 201–207. Bibcode:2006NYASA1093..201S. doi:10.1196/annals.1382.015. PMID 17312260. S2CID 10135931.
- — (January 2008). "Drugs can be used to treat more than disease" (PDF). Nature. 452 (7178): 520. Bibcode:2008Natur.451..520B. doi:10.1038/451520b. PMID 18235476. S2CID 4426990.
- — (2008). "The doomsday argument". Think. 6 (17–18): 23–28. doi:10.1017/S1477175600002943. S2CID 171035249.
- — (2008). "Where Are They? Why I hope the search for extraterrestrial life finds nothing" (PDF). Technology Review (May/June): 72–77.
- Bostrom, Nick (2008). "Letter from Utopia". Studies in Ethics, Law, and Technology. 2 (1). doi:10.2202/1941-6008.1025.
- with Sandberg, Anders (September 2009). "Cognitive Enhancement: Methods, Ethics, Regulatory Challenges" (PDF). Science and Engineering Ethics. 15 (3): 311–341. doi:10.1007/s11948-009-9142-5. PMID 19543814. S2CID 6846531.
- — (2009). "Pascal's Mugging" (PDF). Analysis. 69 (3): 443–445. doi:10.1093/analys/anp062. JSTOR 40607655.
- with Ćirković, Milan; Sandberg, Anders (2010). "Anthropic Shadow: Observation Selection Effects and Human Extinction Risks" (PDF). Risk Analysis. 30 (10): 1495–1506. Bibcode:2010RiskA..30.1495C. doi:10.1111/j.1539-6924.2010.01460.x. PMID 20626690. S2CID 6485564.
- — (2011). "Information Hazards: A Typology of Potential Harms from Knowledge" (PDF). Review of Contemporary Philosophy. 10: 44–79. ProQuest 920893069.
- Bostrom, Nick (2011). "THE ETHICS OF ARTIFICIAL INTELLIGENCE" (PDF). Cambridge Handbook of Artificial Intelligence. Archived from the original (PDF) on 4 March 2016.
- Bostrom, Nick (2011). "Infinite Ethics" (PDF). Analysis and Metaphysics. 10: 9–59.
- — (May 2012). "The Superintelligent Will: Motivation and Instrumental Rationality in Advanced Artificial Agents" (PDF). Minds and Machines. 22 (2): 71–84. doi:10.1007/s11023-012-9281-3. S2CID 7445963.
- with Armstrong, Stuart; Sandberg, Anders (November 2012). "Thinking Inside the Box: Controlling and Using Oracle AI" (PDF). Minds and Machines. 22 (4): 299–324. doi:10.1007/s11023-012-9282-2. S2CID 9464769.
- — (February 2013). "Existential Risk Reduction as Global Priority". Global Policy. 4 (3): 15–31. doi:10.1111/1758-5899.12002.
- with Shulman, Carl (February 2014). "Embryo Selection for Cognitive Enhancement: Curiosity or Game-changer?" (PDF). Global Policy. 5 (1): 85–92. doi:10.1111/1758-5899.12123.
- with Muehlhauser, Luke (2014). "Why we need friendly AI" (PDF). Think. 13 (36): 41–47. doi:10.1017/S1477175613000316. S2CID 143657841.
- Bostrom, Nick (September 2019). "The Vulnerable World Hypothesis". Global Policy. 10 (4): 455–476. doi:10.1111/1758-5899.12718.

== See also ==
- Doomsday argument
- Dream argument
- Effective altruism
- Pascal's mugging
