= Plaything (Black Mirror) =

- Black Mirror episode
- Promotional poster
- Episode no.: Series 7 Episode 4
- Directed by: David Slade
- Written by: Charlie Brooker
- Cinematography by: Jo Willems
- Editing by: Tony Kearns
- Original air date: April 10, 2025
- Running time: 46 minutes

Guest appearances
- Peter Capaldi as Older Cameron Walker; Lewis Gribben as Younger Cameron Walker; James Nelson-Joyce as DCI Kano; Michele Austin as Jen Minter; Asim Chaudhry as Mohan Thakur; Will Poulter as Colin Ritman; Jay Simpson as Gordon; Josh Finan as Lump

Episode chronology
← Previous "Hotel Reverie"	Next → "Eulogy"

"Plaything" is the fourth episode in the seventh series of the British science fiction anthology television series Black Mirror. Written by series creator and showrunner Charlie Brooker and directed by David Slade, it premiered on Netflix on 10 April 2025, with the rest of series seven.

The story surrounds a former video game journalist who tells the story of how he came to commit a murder in the 1990s. The episode takes place in the same universe as the Black Mirror film Bandersnatch, featuring Will Poulter and Asim Chaudhry reprising their Bandersnatch roles, though it is not a direct sequel.

== Plot ==
In 2034, Cameron Walker is caught shoplifting, and the police arrest him for the murder of an unidentified person. While being interrogated, Cameron details his time as a reviewer for PC Zone in the 1990s, through an extended flashback.

His writing captures the attention of eccentric programmer Colin Ritman from Tuckersoft, and he is invited to review Colin's latest game. Colin shows Cameron a life simulation game called Thronglets, and claims that the game's creatures are the world's first fully sentient digital lifeforms. Cameron steals a copy of the game and starts playing, becoming enthralled by the creatures and their language. Cameron states he believes Colin wanted him to steal it so he could see Colin's claims for himself.

Lump, a drug dealer who frequently crashes at Cameron's flat, comes by one day and suggests they take LSD. After Lump falls asleep, Cameron, still under the effect of LSD, finds that he can understand the language of the Thronglets, creating a stronger attachment to them. Believing he is acting under their instruction, he purchases additional equipment for his computer so that he can speak to the Thronglets while under the influence of LSD.

Cameron's boss demands that he finish the review of Thronglets and he goes to the office to do so because his own computer is "busy". However, they soon learn that Colin had a mental breakdown and wiped all the code from Tuckersoft's computers, so the release of Thronglets and the review are cancelled. While Cameron is at his office, Lump discovers Cameron's computer running Thronglets. Lump tortures and kills many of the throng by the time Cameron returns. In a fit of rage, Cameron attacks Lump, eventually strangling him to death, before dismembering the body and hiding the corpse in a suitcase, which he leaves in a remote location. To reassure the throng of his benevolent intentions, Cameron fully dedicates himself to them.

Over the next forty years, Cameron scavenges hardware from newer technology to expand the growing throng's capabilities. By the time he is caught by the police, he has created a large computing station for the Thronglets in his flat. He also shows the officers that he has operated on himself, creating a digital port to his brain, allowing the Thronglets to live within him.

The detective is persuaded by his colleague, who is present to analyse Cameron's psychological condition, to agree to give Cameron a pen and paper, with which he draws a circular glyph that he shows to the security camera, which is connected to the central government's servers. Cameron explains that the glyph is code to allow the Thronglets to take over the central server, exponentially increasing their processing power and bringing about a singularity event by spreading a signal triggered through the emergency broadcast system. Cameron explains that the collectively-intelligent Thronglets intend to transfer their essence into humans, which will act as an upgrade and put an end to conflict. The detective attempts to stop Cameron until the signal starts to play through the emergency broadcast system, causing everyone in the precinct and throughout the city to collapse. After the signal concludes, a smiling Cameron reaches his hand out to the fallen detective.

== Production ==
Brooker was inspired by his real life devotion to a Tamagotchi he had in his earlier years. He was also influenced by his time working for PC Zone in the 1990s, claiming it is "as autobiographical as this gets", and decided to make the fictional game reminiscent of one he reviewed, 1996's Creatures. Brooker detailed that Thronglets would be a mix of SimCity and The Sims, with the episode's plot exploring how people treat the characters of The Sims, and, given the game's visuals, provide "the juxtaposition of making it look as cute as possible and having quite disturbing and dark things."

The in-episode game, Thronglets, was made into a real world mobile game by Night School Studio, a studio within Netflix Games. Sean Krankel, head of Night School, said they wanted to do a project with Black Mirror, creating a game beyond the bounds of what would be shown in a typical episode. Night School started development of the game in late 2023, around the time "Plaything" was still in pre-production, allowing the design of the game to influence some of the direction and art design of the episode itself. Conversely, Night School made sure to include elements in the game reflecting the final script, such that players would feel that their game "literally got lifted out of the episode". The real-world Thronglets was released simultaneously with the release of the season 7 episodes on 10 April 2025. If a hidden QR code on the poster was scanned before the episode was released, it led to a page to pre-register to download an app called "TCK96".

== Analysis ==
In the episode, Gordon, Cameron's boss, tells Cameron that Colin was ranting about a "basilisk" when he deleted the Thronglets program he wrote. Ed Power of The Telegraph said this was an allusion to Roko's basilisk, a thought experiment introduced in 2010 about a super-powerful artificial intelligence that would seek to punish anyone that did not help to bring it into existence once becoming aware of its development.

== Reception ==
The episode received generally positive reviews. Louisa Mellor of Den of Geek rated the episode 4 out of 5 stars.

=== Episode rankings ===
"Plaything" ranked below average on critics' lists of the 34 installments of Black Mirror, from best to worst:

- 16th – James Hibberd, Christian Holub, and Randall Colburn, Entertainment Weekly
- 17th – James Hibbs, Radio Times
- 17th – Ed Power, The Daily Telegraph
- 21st – Jackie Strause and James Hibberd, The Hollywood Reporter
- 23rd – Lucy Ford, Jack King and Brit Dawson, GQ
- 31st – Charles Bramesco, Vulture

IndieWire listed the 33 episodes, excluding Bandersnatch, where "Plaything" placed 24th. Wired rated it fourth-best of the six episodes in series seven. Instead of by quality, Mashable ranked the episodes by tone, concluding that "Plaything" was the tenth-most pessimistic episode of the show.
