= AI successionism =

View that artificial intelligence should become humanity's successor

AI successionism is a view that humanity should hand the world over to AI even if this results in human extinction.

A seminar abstract characterized advocates of "AI successionism" as holding that the replacement of the human species by AI would be good.

According to The Wall Street Journal, a small minority of influential figures, such as Larry Page, thinks AI should replace humanity. In an article for Vox, Sigal Samuel described computer scientist Richard Sutton as an "AI successionist". Émile P. Torres argued that many Silicon Valley leaders embrace a future in which humans will be replaced by digital beings.

Daniel Faggella, who advocates for the creation of AGI systems that are "worthy successors", compared such AGIs to a new torch replacing humanity in carrying the flame. He hypothesized that what is valuable in the flame is consciousness and autopoiesis. He said that advanced AI should morally aim to create a new form of intelligence so powerful and wise that one would "gladly prefer that it (not humanity) determine the future path of life itself".

== History ==
In 1988, roboticist Hans Moravec published Mind Children, in which he expressed the idea that intelligent robots would be like children of humanity and would eventually replace it.

In 2026, Samuel reported that AI successionism had been gaining ground for a decade.

== Criticism ==
Some critics argue for a new form of humanism. Tyler Austin Harper wrote that defending humanity against its "digital doppelgänger" requires a conception of humanity.

== See also ==
- Effective accelerationism
- Effective Altruism
- Utilitarianism
- Longtermism
- Posthumanism
- Voluntary Human Extinction Movement
