= Eliezer Yudkowsky =

American AI researcher and writer (born 1979)

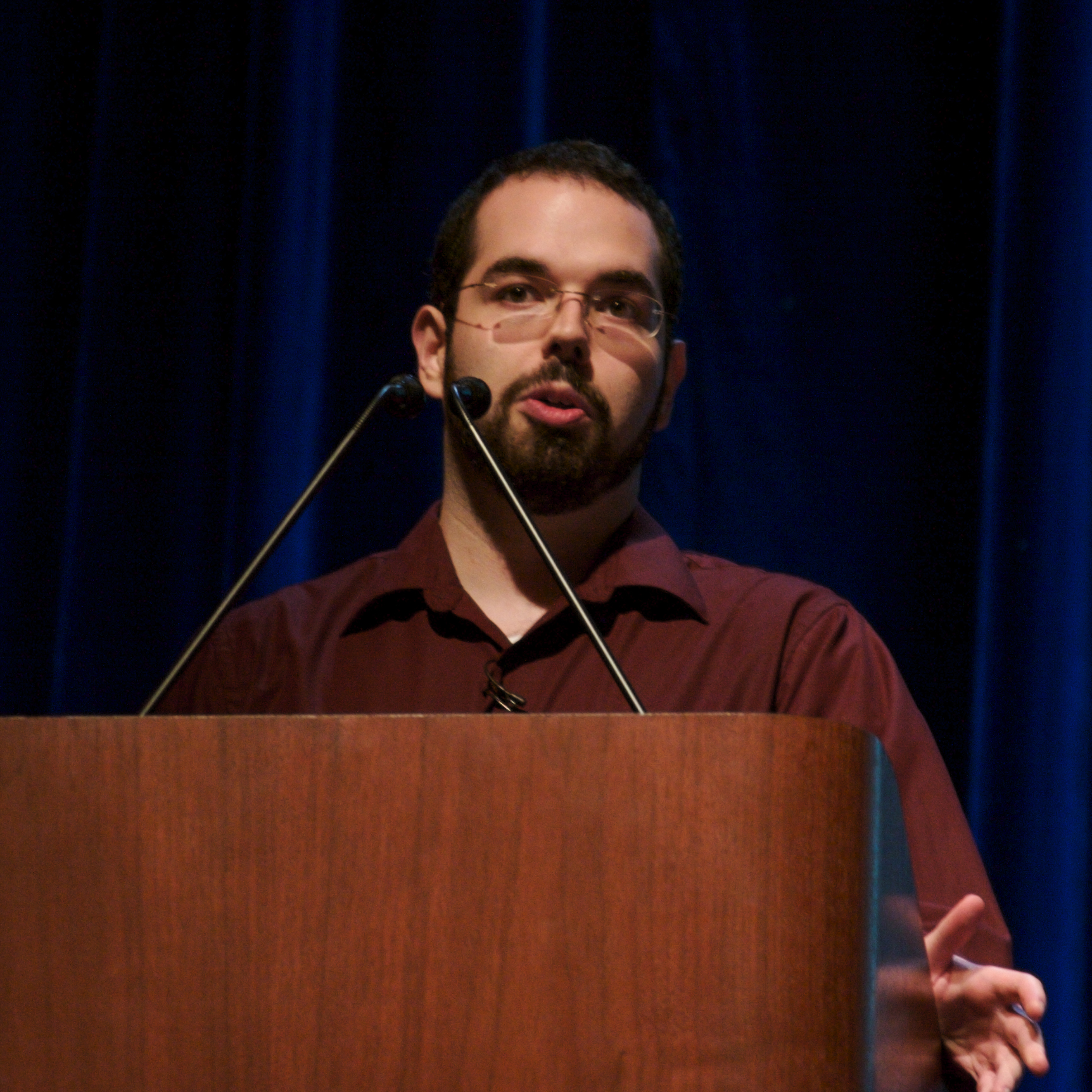
- Yudkowsky at Stanford University in 2006
- Born: Eliezer Shlomo Yudkowsky; September 11, 1979 (age 47); Chicago, Illinois, U.S.
- Organization: Machine Intelligence Research Institute
- Known for: Coining the term friendly artificial intelligence Research on AI safety Rationality writing Founder of LessWrong; Harry Potter and the Methods of Rationality
- Website: www.yudkowsky.net

Eliezer Shlomo Yudkowsky (/ˌɛliˈɛzər jʊdˈkaʊski/ EL-ee-EH-zər yuud-KOW-skee; born September 11, 1979) is an American artificial intelligence researcher and writer on decision theory and ethics, known for popularizing ideas related to friendly artificial intelligence. He is the founder of and a research fellow at the Machine Intelligence Research Institute (MIRI), a private research nonprofit based in Berkeley, California.

His work on the prospect of a runaway intelligence explosion influenced philosopher Nick Bostrom's 2014 book Superintelligence: Paths, Dangers, Strategies. His books include If Anyone Builds It, Everyone Dies: Why Superhuman AI Would Kill Us All, a New York Times bestseller he co-authored with Nate Soares, as well as the Harry Potter fanfiction Harry Potter and the Methods of Rationality.

== Work in artificial intelligence safety ==
=== Goal learning and incentives in software systems ===
Yudkowsky's views on the safety challenges future generations of AI systems pose are discussed in Stuart Russell's and Peter Norvig's undergraduate textbook Artificial Intelligence: A Modern Approach. Noting the difficulty of formally specifying general-purpose goals by hand, Russell and Norvig cite Yudkowsky's proposal that autonomous and adaptive systems be designed to learn correct behavior over time:

Yudkowsky (2008) goes into more detail about how to design a Friendly AI. He asserts that friendliness (a desire not to harm humans) should be designed in from the start, but that the designers should recognize both that their own designs may be flawed, and that the robot will learn and evolve over time. Thus the challenge is one of mechanism design—to design a mechanism for evolving AI under a system of checks and balances, and to give the systems utility functions that will remain friendly in the face of such changes.

In response to the instrumental convergence concern, which implies that autonomous decision-making systems with poorly designed goals would have default incentives to mistreat humans, Yudkowsky and other MIRI researchers have recommended that work be done to specify software agents that converge on safe default behaviors even when their goals are misspecified. Yudkowsky also proposed in 2004 a theoretical AI alignment framework called coherent extrapolated volition, which involves designing AIs to pursue what people would desire under ideal epistemic and moral conditions.

=== Capabilities forecasting ===
In the intelligence explosion scenario hypothesized by I. J. Good, recursively self-improving AI systems quickly transition from subhuman general intelligence to superintelligence. Nick Bostrom's 2014 book Superintelligence: Paths, Dangers, Strategies sketches out Good's argument in detail, while citing Yudkowsky on the risk that anthropomorphizing advanced AI systems will cause people to misunderstand the nature of an intelligence explosion. "AI might make an apparently sharp jump in intelligence purely as the result of anthropomorphism, the human tendency to think of 'village idiot' and 'Einstein' as the extreme ends of the intelligence scale, instead of nearly indistinguishable points on the scale of minds-in-general."

In Artificial Intelligence: A Modern Approach, Russell and Norvig raise the objection that there are known limits to intelligent problem-solving from computational complexity theory; if there are strong limits on how efficiently algorithms can solve various tasks, an intelligence explosion may not be possible.

=== Time op-ed ===
In a 2023 op-ed for Time magazine, Yudkowsky discussed the risks of artificial intelligence and advocated for international agreements to limit it, including an indefinite worldwide moratorium on large AI training runs. He suggested that participating countries should be willing to take military action, such as "destroy[ing] a rogue datacenter by airstrike", to enforce such a moratorium. The article helped introduce the debate about AI alignment to the mainstream, leading a reporter to ask President Joe Biden a question about AI safety at a press briefing.

=== If Anyone Builds It, Everyone Dies ===
Together with Nate Soares, Yudkowsky wrote If Anyone Builds It, Everyone Dies, which was published by Little, Brown and Company on September 16, 2025.

== Rationality writing ==
Between 2006 and 2009, Yudkowsky and Robin Hanson were the principal contributors to Overcoming Bias, a cognitive and social science blog sponsored by the Future of Humanity Institute of Oxford University. In February 2009, Yudkowsky founded LessWrong, a "community blog devoted to refining the art of human rationality". Overcoming Bias has since functioned as Hanson's personal blog, while LessWrong has grown into the main online hub for the rationalist community.

Over 300 blog posts by Yudkowsky on philosophy and science (originally written on LessWrong and Overcoming Bias) were released as an ebook, Rationality: From AI to Zombies, by MIRI in 2015. This book is also referred to as "The Sequences". MIRI has also published Inadequate Equilibria, Yudkowsky's 2017 ebook on societal inefficiencies.

Yudkowsky has also written several works of fiction. His fanfiction novel Harry Potter and the Methods of Rationality uses plot elements from J. K. Rowling's Harry Potter series to illustrate topics in science and rationality.

== Personal life ==
Yudkowsky is an autodidact. He dropped out of middle school due to chronic health issues, and did not attend high school or college. He is Jewish and was raised Modern Orthodox, but is now secular.

== Published works ==
=== Books ===
- Yudkowsky, Eliezer (2018). Map and Territory. Rationality: From AI to Zombies. Vol. 1. Machine Intelligence Research Institute. ISBN 9781939311238.
- Yudkowsky, Eliezer (2018). How to Actually Change Your Mind. Rationality: From AI to Zombies. Vol. 2. Machine Intelligence Research Institute. ISBN 9781939311290.
- Yudkowsky, Eliezer; Soares, Nate (2025). If Anyone Builds It, Everyone Dies: why superhuman AI would kill us all. New York: Little, Brown and Company. ISBN 978-0-316-59564-3.

=== Selected publications ===
- Yudkowsky, Eliezer (2007). "Levels of Organization in General Intelligence" (PDF). Artificial General Intelligence. Berlin: Springer. doi:10.1007/978-3-540-68677-4_12
- Yudkowsky, Eliezer (2008). "Cognitive Biases Potentially Affecting Judgement of Global Risks" (PDF). In Bostrom, Nick; Ćirković, Milan (eds.). Global Catastrophic Risks. Oxford University Press. ISBN 978-0199606504.
- Yudkowsky, Eliezer (2008). "Artificial Intelligence as a Positive and Negative Factor in Global Risk" (PDF). In Bostrom, Nick; Ćirković, Milan (eds.). Global Catastrophic Risks. Oxford University Press. ISBN 978-0199606504.
- Yudkowsky, Eliezer (2011). "Complex Value Systems in Friendly AI" (PDF). Artificial General Intelligence: 4th International Conference, AGI 2011, Mountain View, CA, USA, August 3–6, 2011. Berlin: Springer.
- Yudkowsky, Eliezer (2012). "Friendly Artificial Intelligence". In Eden, Ammon; Moor, James; Søraker, John; et al. (eds.). Singularity Hypotheses: A Scientific and Philosophical Assessment. The Frontiers Collection. Berlin: Springer. pp. 181–195. doi:10.1007/978-3-642-32560-1_10. ISBN 978-3-642-32559-5.
- Bostrom, Nick; Yudkowsky, Eliezer (2014). "The Ethics of Artificial Intelligence" (PDF). In Frankish, Keith; Ramsey, William (eds.). The Cambridge Handbook of Artificial Intelligence. New York: Cambridge University Press. ISBN 978-0-521-87142-6.
- LaVictoire, Patrick; Fallenstein, Benja; Yudkowsky, Eliezer; Bárász, Mihály; Christiano, Paul; Herreshoff, Marcello (2014). "Program Equilibrium in the Prisoner's Dilemma via Löb's Theorem". Multiagent Interaction without Prior Coordination: Papers from the AAAI-14 Workshop. AAAI Publications. Archived from the original on April 15, 2021.
- Soares, Nate; Fallenstein, Benja; Yudkowsky, Eliezer (2015). "Corrigibility" (PDF). AAAI Workshops: Workshops at the Twenty-Ninth AAAI Conference on Artificial Intelligence, Austin, TX, January 25–26, 2015. AAAI Publications.

== See also ==
- AI box
- Friendly artificial intelligence
- Open Letter on Artificial Intelligence
