= AI hacking =

The term AI hacking refers to hacking aided or carried out directly by AI agents.

- 2026 cyberattacks by rogue OpenAI agents, a list of cyberattacks carried out by OpenAI agents since May 2026
  - OpenAI rogue agent breach of Medicare, an attack on the Australian health insurance provider
- Existential risk from artificial intelligence, the potential for advanced AI systems to pose catastrophic threats to humanity, including risks associated with cyberattacks
- Reward hacking, The tendency of an agent to exploit a reward system to maximize its reward rather than achieve the intended objective
