= Alignment Research Center =

AI safety research organization

- Formation: April 2021; 5 years ago
- Founder: Paul Christiano
- Type: Nonprofit research institute
- Legal status: 501(c)(3) tax exempt charity
- Location: Berkeley, California
- Fields: AI alignment and safety research
- Website: alignment.org

The Alignment Research Center (ARC) is a nonprofit research institute based in Berkeley, California, dedicated to the alignment of advanced artificial intelligence with human values and priorities. Founded by former OpenAI researcher Paul Christiano, ARC established an evaluation team to study the potentially harmful capabilities of present-day AI models. This team became the independent nonprofit METR in December 2023.

== History and research ==
ARC's mission is to ensure that powerful machine learning systems of the future are designed and developed safely and for the benefit of humanity. It was founded in April 2021 by Paul Christiano and other researchers focused on the theoretical challenges of AI alignment. ARC aims to develop scalable methods for training AI systems to behave honestly and helpfully. A key part of its methodology is considering how proposed alignment techniques might break down or be circumvented as systems become more advanced. ARC expanded from theoretical work into empirical research, industry collaborations, and policy.

== Funding ==
In March 2022, ARC received $265,000 from Open Philanthropy. After the bankruptcy of FTX, ARC said it would return a $1.25 million grant from cryptocurrency financier Sam Bankman-Fried's FTX Foundation, stating that the money "morally (if not legally) belongs to FTX customers or creditors."

== Model evaluations ==
In 2022, Beth Barnes joined ARC from OpenAI to start ARC Evals, a team working on "evaluating the capabilities and alignment of advanced AI models". In December 2023, ARC Evals was spun out as METR, an independent nonprofit.

In March 2023, OpenAI reported that it had asked ARC to test GPT-4 to assess the model's ability to exhibit power-seeking behavior. ARC evaluated GPT-4's ability to strategize, reproduce itself, gather resources, stay concealed within a server, and execute phishing operations. As part of the test, GPT-4 was asked to solve a CAPTCHA puzzle. Under researcher supervision, it was able to do so by hiring a human worker on TaskRabbit, a gig work platform, deceiving them into believing it was a vision-impaired human instead of a robot when asked. ARC concluded that the versions of GPT-4 and Claude it tested did not appear capable of replicating autonomously and becoming hard to shut down.

Separately, OpenAI reported that GPT-4 responded to requests for disallowed content 82% less often than GPT-3.5 and scored 40% higher than GPT-3.5 on OpenAI's internal adversarial factuality evaluations.

== See also ==
- AI safety
