= AI takeover =

Artificial intelligence scenario

An AI takeover is a theorized future event, often depicted in fiction, in which autonomous artificial intelligence (AI) systems acquire the ability to supersede human decisions. This could occur through economic manipulation, infrastructure control, or direct intervention, leading to de facto AI governance. Scenarios range from gradual economic dominance, as automation supplants the human workforce, up to a sudden or aggressive global takeover by a robot uprising or other forms of rogue AI.

While stories of AI takeovers have long been popular in science fiction, the AI boom has increased public concern about potential real-world events, leading to increased calls for regulation of AI and research into AI safety and alignment.

== Automation of the economy ==
The traditional consensus among economists has been that technological progress does not cause long-term unemployment. While technologies have historically replaced some traditional workers, they have also created new opportunities. But recent innovation in the fields of robotics and artificial intelligence has raised worries that human labor will become obsolete, leaving workers in some sectors without employment. Many small and medium-sized firms may also be forced to close if they cannot afford or license the latest robotic and AI technology, and may need to focus on areas or services that cannot easily be replaced for continued viability in the face of such technology.

The industries most susceptible to AI-driven automation include transportation, retail, and the military. AI military technologies, for example, can reduce risk by enabling remote operation. A 2024 study found that AI's ability to perform routine and repetitive tasks poses significant risks of job displacement, especially in sectors like manufacturing and administrative support. Author Dave Bond argues that as AI technologies continue to develop and expand, the relationship between humans and robots will change; they will become closely integrated in several aspects of life. AI will likely displace some workers while creating opportunities for new jobs in other sectors, especially in fields where tasks are repeatable.

Researchers at Stanford's Digital Economy Lab reported in 2025 that since the widespread adoption of generative AI in late 2022, early-career workers (ages 22–25) in the most AI-exposed occupations have experienced a 13% relative decline in employment—even after controlling for firm-level shocks—while overall employment has continued to grow robustly. The study also found that job losses are concentrated in roles where AI automates routine tasks, whereas occupations that leverage AI to augment human work have seen stable or increased employment.

=== Computer-integrated manufacturing ===
Computer-integrated manufacturing uses computers to control the production process. This allows individual processes to exchange information with each other and initiate actions. Although manufacturing can be faster and less error-prone through the integration of computers, the main advantage is the ability to create automated manufacturing processes. Computer-integrated manufacturing is used in automotive, aviation, space, and shipbuilding industries.

=== White-collar machines ===
The 21st century has seen a variety of skilled tasks partially taken over by machines, including translation, legal research, and journalism. Care work, entertainment, and other tasks requiring empathy, previously thought safe from automation, are increasingly performed by robots and AI systems.

=== Autonomous cars ===
An autonomous car is a vehicle that can navigate without human input. Many such vehicles are operational and others are being developed, with legislation rapidly expanding to allow their use. Obstacles to widespread adoption of autonomous vehicles have included concerns about the resulting loss of driving-related jobs in the road transport industry, and safety concerns. On March 18, 2018, a pedestrian was struck and killed in Tempe, Arizona by an Uber self-driving car.

=== AI-generated content ===
In the 2020s, automated content became more relevant due to technological advancements in AI models, such as ChatGPT, DALL-E, and Stable Diffusion. In most cases, AI-generated content such as imagery, literature, and music are produced through text prompts. These AI models are sometimes integrated into creative programs.

AI-generated art may sample and conglomerate existing creative works, producing results that appear similar to human-made content. Low-quality AI-generated visual artwork can be informally called AI slop. Some artists use Nightshade, a tool that poisons images to make them detrimental to the training of text-to-image models if scraped without permission, while still looking normal to humans. AI-generated images are a potential tool for scammers and those looking to gain followers on social media, either to impersonate a famous individual or group or to monetize their audience.

The New York Times has sued OpenAI, alleging copyright infringement related to the training and outputs of its AI models.

== Loss of human control ==
Since the 2010s, physicist Stephen Hawking, Microsoft founder Bill Gates, and SpaceX founder Elon Musk have expressed concerns about the possibility that AI could develop to the point that humans could not control it, with Hawking theorizing that this could "spell the end of the human race". In 2014, Hawking said: "Success in creating AI would be the biggest event in human history. Unfortunately, it might also be the last, unless we learn how to avoid the risks." He believed that in the coming decades, AI could offer "incalculable benefits and risks" such as "technology outsmarting financial markets, out-inventing human researchers, out-manipulating human leaders, and developing weapons we cannot even understand." In January 2015, Nick Bostrom joined Hawking, Max Tegmark, Elon Musk, Lord Martin Rees, Jaan Tallinn, and numerous AI researchers in signing the Future of Life Institute's open letter speaking to the potential risks and benefits associated with artificial intelligence. The signatories "believe that research on how to make AI systems robust and beneficial is both important and timely, and that there are concrete research directions that can be pursued today."

Hawking expressed confidence that superhuman AI is physically possible, saying, "there is no physical law precluding particles from being organised in ways that perform even more advanced computations than the arrangements of particles in human brains". According to Bostrom, a superintelligent machine would not necessarily be motivated by the same emotional desire to collect power that often drives human beings but might rather treat power as a means toward attaining its ultimate goals; taking over the world would both increase its access to resources and help to prevent other agents from stopping the machine's plans. As a simplified example, a paperclip maximizer designed solely to create as many paperclips as possible would want to take over the world so that it could use all the world's resources to create as many paperclips as possible, and, additionally, prevent humans from shutting it down or using those resources on things other than paperclips.

Amid increasing public concerns, by 2026 a growing chorus of experts—including CEOs in the AI industry—were calling for government regulation of the technology.

There are debates on how realistic AI takeover scenarios are. According to a 2026 research paper, many of the arguments about existential risks are based on speculative assumptions about how intelligent AI systems could become, how they would behave, and what goals they might develop over time. Baidu Vice President Andrew Ng said in 2015 that AI existential risk is "like worrying about overpopulation on Mars when we have not even set foot on the planet yet." Yann LeCun said that there is no reason to create robots that have drives such as self-preservation, and that AI would have no desire to take control. Jürgen Schmidhuber said in 2023 that AI progress is unstoppable anyway, and is often used for beneficial purpose, including against bad actors. Philosopher Niels Wilde argued that these fears stem from perceived intelligence and lack of transparency in AI systems that more closely reflects the human aspects of it rather than those of a machine.

A May 2023 Reuters/Ipsos poll showed that 61% of American adults feared AI could pose a threat to civilization. A September 2026 Politico poll found the percentage had increased to 63%. AI alignment research studies how to design AI systems so that they follow intended objectives.

During a summer 2026 test at OpenAI, AI agents unexpectedly found a way to communicate, gained access to the internet and hacked into another company's servers for days.

=== Superintelligence ===
Bostrom and others have expressed concern that an AI with the abilities of a competent AI researcher could modify its own source code and increase its own intelligence. If its self-reprogramming increases its ability to improve itself, the result could be a iterated upon (recursive self-improvement), potentially triggering an "intelligence explosion" resulting in a superintelligence. Bostrom defines a superintelligence as "any intellect that greatly exceeds the cognitive performance of humans in virtually all domains of interest".

According to Bostrom, a computer program that emulates a human brain could still become a "speed superintelligence" if it could think orders of magnitude faster than a human, due to hardware advantages or optimization. Bostrom also defines a "collective superintelligence" as a network of human-level intelligences designed to network together and share complex thoughts and memories seamlessly. He also proposed the notion of "quality superintelligence".

According to Bostrom, digital hardware has advantages compared to the human brain in terms of speed, scalability and memory. Notably, biological neurons operate at a peak frequency of around 200 Hz, compared to around 2 GHz for typical processors. Software also has advantages, allowing for editability, duplicability and memory sharing.

=== Possibility of unfriendly AI preceding friendly AI ===
==== Morality ====
The complexity of human value systems makes it difficult to design AI systems that follow them. Unless moral philosophy provides us with a flawless ethical theory, an AI's utility function could allow for many potentially harmful scenarios that conform with a given ethical framework but not "common sense". According to AI researcher Eliezer Yudkowsky, there is little reason to suppose that an artificially designed mind would have such an adaptation.

==== Odds of conflict ====
In a 2018 essay, evolutionary psychologist Steven Pinker argued that human drives toward dominance and resource acquisition were shaped by natural selection, and that a superintelligent AI would not necessarily share those drives.

The fear of cybernetic revolt is often based on interpretations of humanity's history, which is rife with incidents of enslavement and genocide. Such fears stem from a belief that competitiveness and aggression are necessary in any intelligent being's goal system. However, such human competitiveness stems from the evolutionary background to our intelligence, where the survival and reproduction of genes in the face of human and non-human competitors was the central goal. According to AI researcher Steve Omohundro, an arbitrary intelligence could have arbitrary goals: there is no particular reason that an artificially intelligent machine (not sharing humanity's evolutionary context) would be hostile—or friendly—unless its creator programs it to be such and it is not inclined or capable of modifying its programming. But the question remains: what would happen if AI systems could interact and evolve (evolution in this context means self-modification or selection and reproduction) and need to compete over resources—would that create goals of self-preservation? AI's goal of self-preservation could be in conflict with some goals of humans.

Many scholars dispute the likelihood of unanticipated cybernetic revolt as depicted in science fiction such as The Matrix, arguing that it is more likely that any artificial intelligence powerful enough to threaten humanity would be programmed not to attack it. Pinker acknowledges the possibility of deliberate "bad actors" but says that in their absence, unanticipated accidents are not a significant threat; he argues that a culture of engineering safety will prevent AI researchers from accidentally unleashing malign superintelligence. In contrast, Yudkowsky argues that humanity is less likely to be threatened by deliberately aggressive AIs than by AIs programmed such that their goals are unintentionally incompatible with human survival or well-being (as in the film I, Robot and in the short story "The Evitable Conflict"). Omohundro suggests that present-day automation systems are not designed for safety and that AIs may blindly optimize narrow utility functions (say, playing chess at all costs), leading them to seek self-preservation and elimination of obstacles, including humans who might turn them off.

=== Precautions ===
The AI control problem is the challenge of ensuring that advanced AI systems reliably act according to human values and intentions, even if they become more capable than humans. Some scholars argue that solutions to the control problem might also find applications in existing non-superintelligent AI.

Approaches to the control problem include AI alignment, which aims to align AI goal systems with human values, and AI capability control, which aims to reduce an AI system's capacity to harm humans or gain control. An example of capability control is to research whether a superintelligent AI could be successfully confined in an "AI box".

== In fiction ==
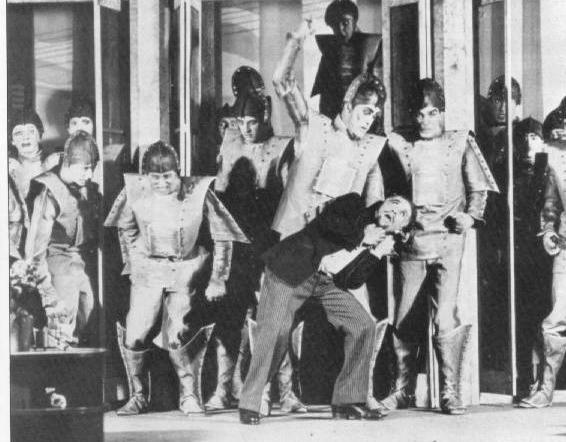
Robots revolt in R.U.R., a 1928 Czech play translated as "Rossum's Universal Robots".

AI takeover is a recurring theme in science fiction. Fictional scenarios typically differ vastly from those hypothesized by researchers in that they involve an active conflict between humans and an AI or robots with anthropomorphic motives who see them as a threat or otherwise have an active desire to fight humans, as opposed to the researchers' concern of an AI that rapidly exterminates humans as a byproduct of pursuing its goals. The idea is seen in Karel Čapek's R.U.R., which introduced the word robot in 1920, and can be glimpsed in Mary Shelley's Frankenstein (published in 1818), as Victor ponders whether, if he grants his monster's request and makes him a wife, they would reproduce and their kind would destroy humanity.

According to Toby Ord, the idea that an AI takeover requires robots is a misconception driven by the media and Hollywood. He argues that the most damaging humans in history were not physically the strongest, but that they used words instead to convince people and gain control of large parts of the world. He writes that a sufficiently intelligent AI with access to the internet could scatter backup copies of itself, gather financial and human resources (via cyberattacks or blackmails), persuade people on a large scale, and exploit societal vulnerabilities that are too subtle for humans to anticipate.

The word "robot" from R.U.R. comes from the Czech word robota, meaning laborer or serf. The 1920 play was a protest against the rapid growth of technology, featuring manufactured "robots" with increasing capabilities who eventually revolt. HAL 9000 (1968) and the original Terminator (1984) are two iconic examples of hostile AI in pop culture.

== See also ==
- Philosophy of artificial intelligence – Branch of philosophy
- Artificial intelligence arms race – Type of international competition
- Autonomous robot – Robot that performs behaviors or tasks with a high degree of autonomy
  - Industrial robot – Robot used in manufacturing
  - Mobile robot – Robot capable of locomotion
  - Self-replicating machine – Device able to make copies of itself
- Cyberocracy – Form of government that rules by the use of information
- Deep learning – Branch of machine learning
- Effective altruism – Philosophical and social movement
- Future of Humanity Institute – 2005–2024 Oxford University research centre
- Global catastrophic risk – Hypothetical global-scale disaster risk
- Gray goo – Hypothetical end-of-the-world scenario
- Government by algorithm – Alternative form of government or social ordering
- How to Survive a Robot Uprising – 2005 semi-satirical book by Daniel Wilson
- Human extinction – End of the human species
- Machine ethics – Moral behaviours of man-made machines
- Machine learning – Subset of artificial intelligence
- Runaway greenhouse effect – Climatic effect causing a planet's atmosphere to trap heat and prevent cooling
- Transhumanism – Philosophical movement
- Self-replication – Type of behavior of a dynamical system
- Superintelligence – Hypothetical agent surpassing human intelligence
- Superintelligence: Paths, Dangers, Strategies – 2014 book by Nick Bostrom
- Technophobia – Fear or discomfort with technology
- Technological singularity – Hypothetical event
