= Tom Murphy VII =

Computer programmer and YouTuber

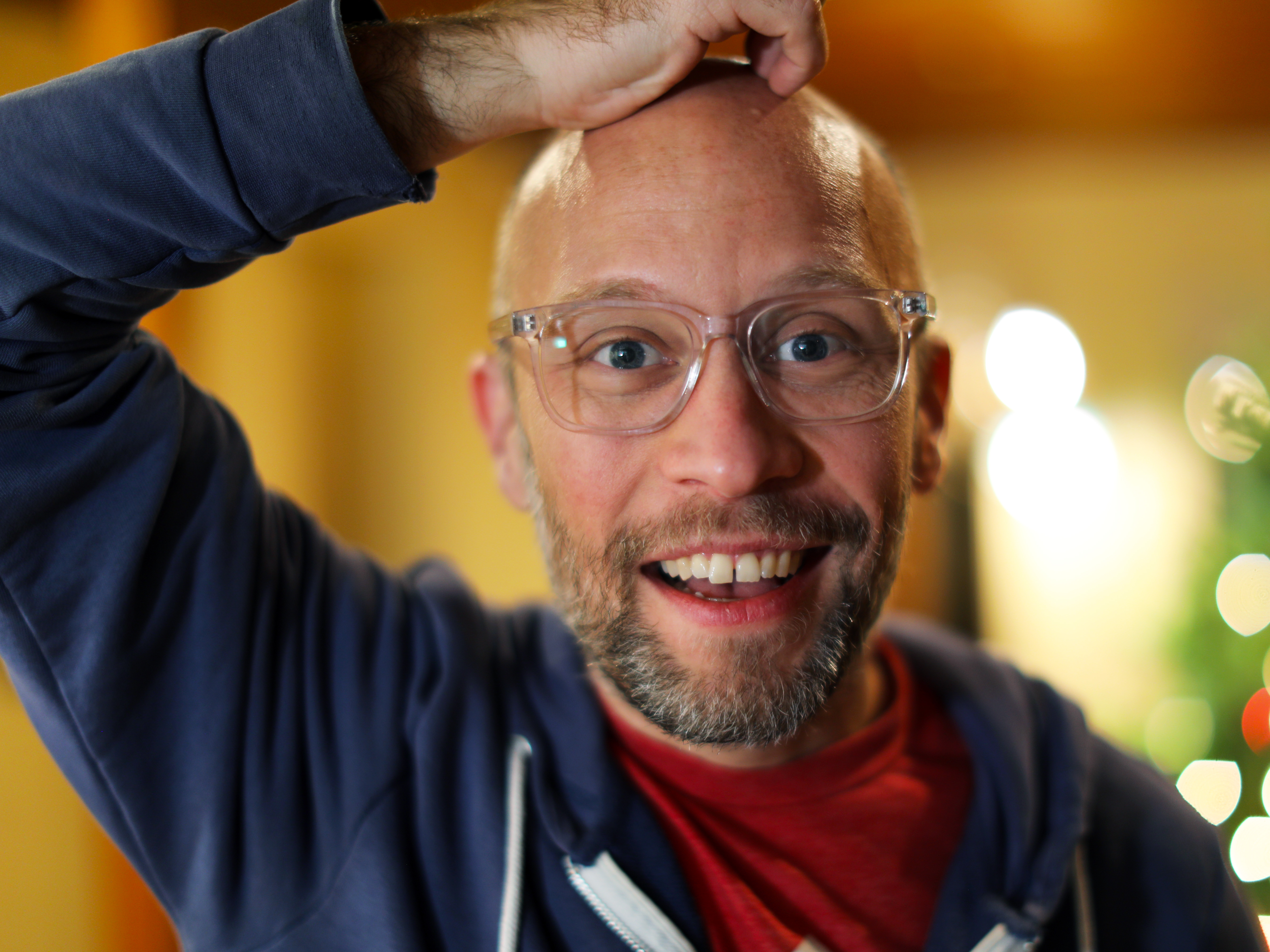
- Murphy in 2020
- Born: Thomas Walter Murphy VII; September 27, 1979 (age 46)
- Other name: Tom7
- Education: Carnegie Mellon University (PhD)

YouTube information
- Channel: suckerpinch
- Years active: 2006–present
- Subscribers: 201 thousand
- Views: 13 million
- Last updated: August 5, 2026
- Website: tom7.org

Thomas Walter Murphy VII (born September 27, 1979), also known as Tom 7 or by his YouTube handle of suckerpinch, is a computer scientist and YouTuber who is known for computer-science and engineering projects. His projects include training an artificial intelligence to play NES games, "reverse-emulating" the NES to play SNES games, and a recut of Star Wars: Episode IV in alphabetical order. He contributes papers to the satirical computer science conference SIGBOVIK.

== Pac Tom project ==
In 2006, Murphy started a project to run every mile of every street in the city of Pittsburgh: over 1,500 miles in total. He finished the project in 2022, totaling 3,663.1 miles over 269 runs. The end of the project was covered by local radio stations, magazines, and YouTube's official blog.

== Rupert property ==
Murphy investigated the Rupert property in geometry. A polyhedron with this property can be made to drill through another copy of the same polyhedron without breaking the exterior structure – i.e., the result might be a large hole in the copy, but the outer structure is still continuously connected. This was speculated to be true for all convex polyhedra, but attempts to find examples of such a pass-through for certain convex polyhedra were unsuccessful as of 2024–2025. Murphy's attempts to find examples for the snub cube (an Archimedean solid) via computer search failed. He switched to working on a proof that the snub cube instead had the "nopert" property: that no such pass-through was possible. In 2025, Jakob Steininger and Sergey Yurkevich published a preprint with their own proof arguing that a certain convex polyhedron – a "noperthedron" – definitively does not have the Rupert property.
