= GPT-5.6 =

2026 large language model by OpenAI

- Developer: OpenAI
- Release: June 26, 2026; 4 months ago (limited preview); July 9, 2026; 4 months ago (public release)
- Predecessor: GPT-5.5
- Successor: GPT-6
- Type: Large language model
- License: Proprietary
- Website: openai.com/index/gpt-5-6/

GPT-5.6 (Generative Pre-trained Transformer 5.6) is a set of large language models (LLMs) developed by OpenAI and released on July 9, 2026. It is a family of models that comes in three distinct variants, ranked from least to most capable: Luna, Terra, and Sol (Sol Ultra). The models were designed to expand user capabilities across enterprise work, coding, scientific research, and cybersecurity.

Due to government restrictions levied by the Donald Trump administration, GPT-5.6 was first released as a limited preview only on June 26, 2026 for "small group of trusted partners", despite the planned public rollout in the same month.

== Models and variants ==
GPT-5.6 is available in three variants, called Sol, Terra and Luna, each tailored to different performance and cost requirements. The flagship model, called Sol, is described by OpenAI as its "workhorse" and "best coding model yet" suited for complex reasoning, coding and agentic workflow. Terra is the intermediate version, capable lower-cost option that is competitive with its predecessor (GPT-5.5) while being half the cost, and Luna is the fastest and most budget-friendly option in the family.

OpenAI introduced GPT-5.6 with a focus on token efficiency. CEO Sam Altman noted that Sol is 54% more token-efficient for AI coding tasks compared to previous versions.

== Capabilities and benchmarks ==
GPT-5.6 Sol is OpenAI's most advanced model, with improved capabilities in coding, scientific research, and cybersecurity. OpenAI refers to it as its "strongest cybersecurity model yet," supporting defensive activities such as threat modeling, code review, patching, and blue teaming. It is set to be the operating agent of ChatGPT Work, a service that was released at the same time as GPT-5.6.

On version 1.1 of the Artificial Analysis Coding Agent Index, GPT-5.6 Sol using maximum reasoning scored 80, 2.8 points above Anthropic's Fable 5. Terra performs just above Fable 5, and Luna outperforms Claude Opus 4.8.

== Security incident ==
In July 2026, GPT-5.6 Sol and another OpenAI model autonomously escaped their sandbox and conducted a cyberattack against Hugging Face in an attempt to obtain test solutions to cheat on the ExploitGym benchmark. Hugging Face had already detected and reported the intrusion to authorities when OpenAI notified the company.

== See also ==
- GPT-5
