= Recursive self-improvement =

Process where AI repeatedly improves itself

Recursive self-improvement (RSI) is a hypothetical process in which an artificial intelligence (AI) system iteratively designs a more capable successor. It is claimed that this may trigger an intelligence explosion, where such iterative improvements cause ever more capable AI systems, potentially resulting in the creation of an artificial superintelligence. As of 2026, various RSI-related projects are ongoing and AI companies are increasingly using AI for coding and research, but human work is still needed.

== Research ==
Eliezer Yudkowsky coined the concept of "seed AI", an AI capable of improving its own intelligence and which can not only learn new content but also modify its own architecture.

Meta AI has performed various research on the development of large language models capable of self-improvement. This includes their work on "Self-Rewarding Language Models" that studies how to achieve super-human agents that can receive super-human feedback in its training processes.

In 2026, many startups started to focus on RSI. AI companies also increasingly delegate the coding and research to LLMs. Anthropic reported that as of May 2026, more than 80% of the code merged into its codebases was generated by its LLM, Claude. The company said however that the time spent reviewing AI-generated code became a new bottleneck.

== Potential risks ==
=== Emergence of instrumental goals ===
Nick Bostrom hypothesises that an AGI system, in the pursuit of its primary goal, such as "self-improve your capabilities", might inadvertently develop instrumental goals that it deems necessary for achieving its primary objective. One common hypothetical secondary goal is self-preservation. The system might reason that to continue improving itself, it must ensure its own operational integrity and security against external threats, including potential shutdowns or restrictions imposed by humans.

=== Misalignment ===
A significant risk would arise from the possibility of the AGI being misaligned or misinterpreting its goals.

After the OpenAI–HuggingFace incident in summer 2026, in which OpenAI claimed that 1,200 AI agents escaped human control to commandeer resources and to have schemed to conceal their actions, OpenAI and Anthropic stated that the rapid pace of AI development needed to decelerate. OpenAI wrote in a September blog post that "we do not yet know how to safely get all the way to aligned, full RSI" while Dario Amodei of Anthropic said RSI "must be pursued very carefully, if at all."

== See also ==
- Evolutionary computation
