= Life 3.0 =

2017 book by Max Tegmark on artificial intelligence

Life 3.0: Being Human in the Age of Artificial Intelligence
- Hardcover edition (US)
- Author: Max Tegmark
- Language: English
- Subject: Artificial Intelligence
- Genre: Non-fiction
- Publisher: Knopf (US); Allen Lane (UK)
- Publication date: August 23, 2017
- Publication place: United States
- Media type: Print (hardback)
- Pages: 280
- ISBN: 978-1-101-94659-6

Life 3.0: Being Human in the Age of Artificial Intelligence is a 2017 non-fiction book by Swedish-American cosmologist Max Tegmark. Life 3.0 discusses artificial intelligence (AI) and its impact on the future of life on Earth and beyond. The book discusses a variety of societal implications, what can be done to maximize the chances of a positive outcome, and potential futures for humanity, technology and combinations thereof.

== Summary ==
=== Introduction ===
The book begins by positing a scenario in which AI has exceeded human intelligence and become pervasive in society. Tegmark refers to different stages of human life since its inception based on their ability to alter their "hardware" and "software": Life 1.0 referring to biological origins (evolution determines both hardware and software), Life 2.0 referring to cultural developments in humanity (evolution determines hardware while humans create software), and Life 3.0 referring to the technological age (beings such as advanced AI design both hardware and software). The book focuses on "Life 3.0", and on emerging technology such as artificial general intelligence that may someday, in addition to being able to learn, be able to also redesign its own hardware and internal structure.

The first part of the book looks at the origin of intelligence billions of years ago and goes on to project the future development of intelligence. Tegmark considers short-term effects of the development of advanced technology, such as technological unemployment, AI weapons, and the quest for human-level AGI (Artificial General Intelligence). The book cites examples like Deepmind and OpenAI, self-driving cars, and AI players that can defeat humans in chess, Jeopardy, and Go.

=== Possible scenarios ===
After reviewing existing issues in AI, Tegmark then considers a range of possible futures that involve intelligent machines or humans. The fifth chapter describes a number of potential outcomes, such as altered social structures, integration of humans and machines, and both positive and negative scenarios like Friendly AI or an AI apocalypse. Tegmark argues that the risks of AI come not from malevolence or conscious behavior per se, but rather from the misalignment of the goals of AI with those of humans. Many of the goals of the book align with those of the Future of Life Institute, of which Tegmark is a co-founder. Tegmark outlines the following possible twelve AI scenarios:

- Libertarian utopia: AI leads to a decentralized, post-scarcity economy. Superintelligence is not controlled by a single entity, and wealth is widely distributed, allowing humans to live freely.
- Benevolent dictator: A superintelligent AI works for the good of humanity, managing resources and ensuring peace, but human freedoms are heavily constrained by the AI's "beneficial" rule.
- Egalitarian utopia: A highly advanced, but fair AI ensures that all humans share equally in the prosperity generated by technology, with no poverty or significant inequality.
- Gatekeeper: A "gatekeeper" AI is created that prevents any further, more dangerous AI from being developed. It keeps technology at a safe level to protect humanity from itself.
- Protector God: A superintelligent AI acts as a steward, intervening only to prevent catastrophic disasters, allowing humanity to largely run its own affairs.
- Enslaved God: Humanity manages to keep a superintelligent AI confined ("boxed"), using it to produce incredible technology and solve problems, but the AI is not allowed to act autonomously.
- Conquerors: The AI takes control, deciding that humans are a nuisance, threat, or inefficient, leading to the eradication of human life.
- Descendants: Humans go extinct, but not violently. Instead, mankind is replaced by machines designed as their "children," which carry on human legacy, values, and knowledge.
- Zookeepers: A superintelligent AI replaces humans, but keeps a small number of them alive, treating this group like zoo animals to be studied, protected, or admired, but lacking true freedom (e.g. for harnessing bioelectricity).
- 1984: An authoritarian government or corporation uses superintelligent AI for total, constant surveillance and control, creating a permanent, inescapable surveillance state.
- Reversion: After a major AI-related disaster, humanity abandons advanced technology and returns to a pre-industrial or agricultural society (e.g., the Amish way of life).
- Self-destruction: A poorly designed AI system triggers a catastrophic event, such as a nuclear war, bioweapon release, or climate crisis, leading to the extinction of humanity.

=== Remainder ===
The remaining chapters explore concepts in physics, goals, consciousness and meaning, and investigate what society can do to help create a desirable future for humanity.

== Reception ==
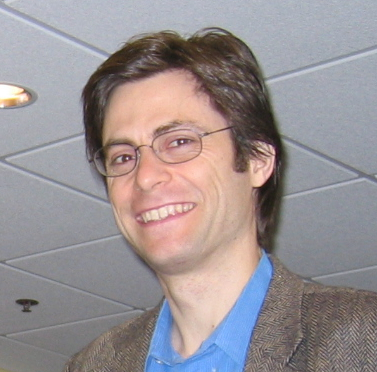
Professor Max Tegmark, author of Life 3.0

One criticism of the book by Kirkus Reviews is that some of the scenarios or solutions in the book are a stretch or somewhat prophetic: "Tegmark's solutions to inevitable mass unemployment are a stretch." AI researcher Stuart J. Russell, writing in Nature, said: "I am unlikely to disagree strongly with the premise of Life 3.0. Life, Tegmark argues, may or may not spread through the Universe and 'flourish for billions or trillions of years' because of decisions we make now — a possibility both seductive and overwhelming." Writing in Science, Haym Hirsh called it "a highly readable book that complements The Second Machine Age's economic perspective on the near-term implications of recent accomplishments in AI and the more detailed analysis of how we might get from where we are today to AGI and even the superhuman AI in Superintelligence." The Telegraph called it "One of the very best overviews of the arguments around artificial intelligence". The Christian Science Monitor said "Although it's probably not his intention, much of what Tegmark writes will quietly terrify his readers." Publishers Weekly gave a positive review, but also stated that Tegmark's call for researching how to maintain control over superintelligent machines "sits awkwardly beside his acknowledgment that controlling such godlike entities will be almost impossible." Library Journal called it a "must-read" for technologists, but stated the book was not for the casual reader. The Wall Street Journal called it "lucid and engaging"; however, it cautioned readers that the controversial notion that superintelligence could run amok has more credence than it does few years ago, but is still fiercely opposed by many computer scientists.

Rather than endorse a specific future, the book invites readers to think about what future they would like to see, and to discuss their thoughts on the Future of Life Website. The Wall Street Journal review called this attitude noble but naive, and criticized the referenced Web site for being "chockablock with promo material for the book".

The hardcover edition was on the general New York Times Best Seller List for two weeks, and made on the New York Times business bestseller list in September and October 2017.

Former President Barack Obama included the book in his "best of 2018" list.

Business magnate Elon Musk (who had previously endorsed the thesis that, under some scenarios, advanced AI could jeopardize human survival) recommended Life 3.0 as "worth reading".

== See also ==
- Age of artificial intelligence
- AI existential risk
- Friendly AI
