= AAAI/ACM Conference on AI, Ethics, and Society =

Academic conference series

- Abbreviation: AIES
- Discipline: Computer science

Publication details
- Publisher: Association for Computing Machinery
- History: 2018 - current
- Frequency: Annual
- Website: https://www.aies-conference.com/

The AAAI/ACM Conference on AI, Ethics, and Society (AIES) is a peer-reviewed academic conference series focused on societal and ethical aspects of artificial intelligence. The conference is jointly organized by the Association for Computing Machinery, namely the Special Interest Group on Artificial Intelligence (SIGAI), and the Association for the Advancement of Artificial Intelligence, and "is designed to shift the dynamics of the conversation on AI and ethics to concrete actions that scientists, businesses and society alike can take to ensure this promising technology is ushered into the world responsibility." The conference community includes lawyers, practitioners, and academics in computer science, philosophy, public policy, economics, human-computer interaction, and more. Its papers are regularly cited highlighting ethical issues with AI technologies, including automation, democracy, policy, power, or bias.

As of 2025, the conference is sponsored by the National Science Foundation as well as various large technology companies including Google, Lenovo, and IBM Research. In recent years, sponsors include Sony, eBay, Salesforce, DeepMind, Meta and others.

== List of conferences ==
Past AIES conferences include:

Year	Location	Date	Keynote/Invited speakers	Link
2025	Madrid, Spain	October 20–22	Ted Lechterman, Maria Eriksson, David Leslie, Urs Gasser, Miriam Fernandez, Emanuelle Burton, Shannon Vallor, Julienne LaChance, Samer Hassan, Emma Ruttkamp-Bloem	
2024	Santa Clara, California	October 21–23	Diyi Yang, Emanuelle Burton, Casey Fiesler, Amy J. Ko, Amanda McCroskery, Marty J. Wolf, David Danks, danah boyd	Website
2023	Montreal, Canada	August 8–10	Annette Zimmermann, Jamie Morgenstern, Paola Ricaurte Quijano, Kate Larson, Gary Marchant, Roxana Daneshjou, Atoosa Kasirzadeh	Website
2022	Oxford, England	August 1–3	Deb Raji, Ronald Arkin, Shannon Vallor, Abeba Birhane, Bertram Malle, Karen Levy	Website
2021	Virtual	May 19–21	Ifeoma Ajunwa, Timnit Gebru, Arvind Narayanan	Website
2020	New York, New York	February 6–8	Peter Dabrock, Anita Gurumurthy, Charlton McIlwain, Gina Neff, Frank Pasquale	Website
2019	Honolulu, Hawaii	January 27–28	Ryan Calo, Susan Athey, Anca Dragan, David Danks	Website
2018	New Orleans, Louisiana	February 1–3	Iyad Rahwan, Edmond Awad, Carol Rose, Richard Freeman, Patrick Lin, Tenzin Priyadarshi	Website

== See also ==
- Ethics of artificial intelligence
- Philosophy of artificial intelligence
- Regulation of artificial intelligence
