= AIES =

AIES may refer to:

- AAAI/ACM Conference on AI, Ethics, and Society, a computer science conference
- Arava Institute for Environmental Studies, an Israeli research institute
- Artificial Intelligence for the Earth Systems, a scientific journal
- Austrian Institute for European and Security Policy
