= Permutation City =

1994 science fiction novel by Greg Egan

- Cover of first edition (hardcover)
- Author: Greg Egan
- Language: English
- Genre: Hard science fiction, Postcyberpunk
- Publisher: Millennium Orion Publishing Group
- Publication date: 1994
- Publication place: Australia
- Media type: Print (Hardcover and paperback)
- Pages: 310
- ISBN: 1-85798-174-X
- OCLC: 30834713
- Website: Official website

Permutation City is a 1994 science-fiction novel by Greg Egan that explores many concepts, including quantum ontology, through various philosophical aspects of artificial life and simulated reality. Sections of the story were adapted from Egan's 1992 short story "Dust", which dealt with many of the same philosophical themes. Permutation City won the John W. Campbell Award for the best science-fiction novel of the year in 1995 and was nominated for the Philip K. Dick Award the same year. The novel was also cited in a 2003 Scientific American article on multiverses by Max Tegmark.

== Themes and setting ==
Permutation City asks whether there is a difference between a computer simulation of a person and a "real" person. It focuses on a model of consciousness and reality, the Dust Theory, similar to the Ultimate Ensemble Mathematical Universe hypothesis proposed by Max Tegmark. It uses the assumption that human consciousness is Turing-computable: that consciousness can be produced by a computer program. The book deals with consequences of human consciousness being amenable to mathematical manipulation, as well as some consequences of simulated realities. In this way, Egan attempts to deconstruct notions of self, memory, and mortality, and of physical reality.

The Autoverse is an artificial life simulator based on a cellular automaton complex enough to represent the substratum of an artificial chemistry. It is deterministic, internally consistent and vaguely resembles real chemistry. Tiny environments, simulated in the Autoverse and filled with populations of a simple, designed lifeform, Autobacterium lamberti, are maintained by a community of enthusiasts obsessed with getting A. lamberti to evolve, something the Autoverse chemistry seems to make extremely difficult.

Related explorations go on in virtual realities (VR), which make extensive use of patchwork heuristics to crudely simulate immersive and convincing physical environments, albeit at a maximal speed of seventeen times slower than "real" time, limited by the optical crystal computing technology used at the time of the story. Larger VR environments, covering a greater internal volume in greater detail, are cost-prohibitive even though VR worlds are computed selectively for inhabitants, reducing redundancy and extraneous objects and places to the minimal details required to provide a convincing experience to those inhabitants; for example, a mirror not being looked at would be reduced to a reflection value, with details being "filled in" as necessary if its owner were to turn their model-of-a-head towards it.

Within the story, "Copies" – digital renderings of human brains with complete subjective consciousness, the technical descendants of ever more comprehensive medical simulations – live within VR environments after a process of "scanning". Copies are the only objects within VR environments that are simulated in full detail, everything else being produced with varying levels of generalisation, lossy compression, and hashing at all times.

Copies form the conceptual spine of the story, and much of the plot deals directly with the "lived" experience of Copies, most of whom are copies of billionaires suffering terminal illnesses or fatal accidents, who spend their existences in VR worlds of their creating, usually maintained by trust funds, which independently own and operate large computing resources for their sakes, separated physically and economically from most of the rest of the world's computing power, which is privatized as a fungible commodity. Although the wealthiest copies face no financial difficulties, they can still be threatened because copies lack political and legal rights (they are considered software), especially where the global economy is in recession. Hence they cannot afford to retreat into solipsism and ignore what is happening in the real world.

At the opposite end from the wealthy Copies are those who can only afford to live in the virtual equivalent of "Slums", being bounced around the globe to the cheapest physical computing available at any given time in order to save money, while running at much slower speeds compared to the wealthy Copies. Their slowdown rate depends on how much computer power their meager assets can afford, as computer power is traded on a global exchange and goes to the highest bidder at any point in time. When they cannot afford to be "run" at all, they can be frozen as a "snapshot" until computer power is relatively affordable again. A Copy whose financial assets can only generate sufficient interest to run at a very slow rate is stuck in a rut because he/she/it becomes unemployable and is unable to generate new income, which may lead to a downward spiral.

By creating this scenario, Egan postulates a world where economic inequality can persist even in one's (virtual) afterlife.

The concept of solipsism is also examined prominently, with many less-wealthy Copies attending social functions called Slow Clubs, where socialising Copies agree to synchronise with the slowest person present. Many of these less-wealthy Copies become completely deracinated from their former lives and from world events, or else become Witnesses, who spend their time observing (at considerable time lapse) world events unfold, at the cost of any meaningful relationships with their fellow Copies. A subculture of lower/middle-class Copies, calling themselves Solipsist Nation after a philosophical work by their nominal founder, choose to completely repudiate the "real" world and any Copies still attached to it, reprogramming their models-of-brains and their VR environments in order to design themselves into their own personal vision of paradise, of whatever size and detail, disregarding slowdown in the process.

Egan's later novels Diaspora and Schild's Ladder deal with related issues from other perspectives.

== Plot ==
Permutation City follows the lives of several people in a near future reality where the Earth is ravaged by the effects of climate change, the economy and culture are largely globalised, and civilisation has accumulated vast amounts of cloud computing power and memory which is distributed internationally and is traded in a public market called the QIPS Exchange (Quadrillion Instructions Per Second, see MIPS).

This great computing capacity has enabled the creation of "Copies", whole brain emulations of "scanned" humans which are detailed enough to allow for subjective conscious experience on the part of the emulation. Scanning has become safe enough and common enough to allow for a few wealthy or dedicated humans to afford to create backups of themselves. Copies do not yet possess human rights under the laws of any nation or international body.

=== Part one ===
In 2050, Paul Durham, a Sydney man having experimented on Copies of himself, offers wealthy Copies prime real estate in an advanced supercomputer which, according to his pitch, will never be shut down and never experience any slowdown whatsoever. Durham predicts that efforts to utilise chaotic effects will clash with Copy rights, as both Copies and weather simulations will demand increasing QIPS Exchange shares. All that each Copy must do is to make the comparatively small investment of "two million ecus" in order to bring Durham's fantasy computer into existence.

Durham hires Maria Deluca, an Autoverse enthusiast, to design an Autoverse program which, given a powerful enough computer, could generate a planet's worth of evolvable Autoverse life. He also clandestinely commissions a famous virtual reality architect, Malcolm Carter, to build a full scale VR city; outside of Durham's knowledge, Carter secretly hacks two Slum-dwelling Solipsist Nation Copies (Peer and Kate) into this city's machine code. When Maria learns of a computer fraud investigation on Durham, she confronts him.

Durham reveals that his self-experiments convinced him that there is no difference, even in principle, between physics and mathematics, and that all mathematically possible structures exist, among them our physics and therefore our spacetime, a belief he refers to as "Dust Theory". The dust theory implies that all possible universes exist and are equally real, emerging spontaneously from their own mathematical self-consistency. Because Copies exist in virtual realities held together by heuristics merely for the sake of their experience, it should be the case that when a Copy is terminated and deleted, its own conscious experience will continue. Indeed, Durham himself claims to have been through such a process dozens of times.

Durham uses the money from his financial backing to simulate a minute or two of a "Garden of Eden" configuration of an infinitely-expanding, massively complex cellular automaton universe, in which each iteration of the expansion serves to "manufacture" an extra layer of blocks of a computing configuration. According to his Dust Theory, such a simulation would create a self-consistent "TVC universe" to persist in its own terms even after its termination and deletion. His and his investors' Copies would therefore persist indefinitely in the simulation. The Autoverse planetary seed program designed by Maria is included in the TVC universe package for his investors to explore once life had evolved there after it had been run on a significantly large segment of the TVC universe (referred to as "Planet Lambert").

After a successful launch, simulation, termination, and deletion of the TVC universe, Durham and Maria have uncomfortable sex in awkward celebration, and later that night, while Maria is asleep, Durham disembowels himself with a kitchen knife in his bathtub, believing his role as the springboard for his deleted TVC Copy to discover its true identity to be fulfilled.

=== Part two ===
Maria wakes in Permutation City seven thousand years of subjective time after the launch, furious at Durham for awakening her. He explains to her that intelligent life has arisen on Planet Lambert in the form of complex swarms of insect-like eusocial beings, evolved from Maria's original Autobacterium hydrophilus. He wishes to use Maria's slice of the universe's processing power (as a founder of the world she was given de facto control of a continuously-growing zone of the processor network as well) to make forbidden first contact with Lambertians. He believes this is necessary because he has lost the ability to pause the Autoverse simulation or slow it down past a constant multiple of the size of the processor network it occupies. Durham is worried that the rules of their simulated universe are breaking down.

They discover that the combined intelligence of Lambertians has exceeded that of Permutation City; as such, the TVC universe is being overwritten into a system existing solely as a byproduct of the self-perpetuation of the Autoverse. Durham, Maria, and some other companions quickly launch an emergency expedition into the Autoverse to attempt to convince the Lambertians of the validity of the creator hypothesis and its methodological preferentiality over their own newly formulated theory. Unfortunately, the Lambertians reject the creator theory, prompting Permutation City and the entirety of TVC processor-networks to begin collapsing into nothing. Durham and Maria inform the inhabitants of Permutation City, who launch a new TVC Garden of Eden in their universe's final moments. Maria convinces a reluctant Durham to come along to a new universe, pledging to work with her to discover the underlying rules that governed the Autoverse's takeover of Permutation City.

== See also ==
- Artificial consciousness
- Mathematical universe hypothesis
- Mind uploading
  - Mind uploading in fiction
  - The Age of Em
