= Superintelligence: Paths, Dangers, Strategies =

2014 book by Nick Bostrom

- First edition
- Author: Nick Bostrom
- Language: English
- Subject: Artificial intelligence
- Genre: Philosophy, popular science
- Publisher: Oxford University Press
- Publication date: July 3, 2014 (UK); September 1, 2014 (US)
- Publication place: United Kingdom
- Media type: Print, e-book, audiobook
- Pages: 352 pp.
- ISBN: 978-0199678112
- Preceded by: Global Catastrophic Risks

Superintelligence: Paths, Dangers, Strategies is a 2014 book by the philosopher Nick Bostrom. It explores how superintelligence could be created and what its features and motivations might be. It argues that superintelligence, if created, would be difficult to control, and that it could take over the world in order to accomplish its goals. The book also presents strategies to help make superintelligences whose goals benefit humanity. It was particularly influential for raising concerns about existential risk from artificial intelligence.

== Synopsis ==
It is unknown whether human-level artificial intelligence will arrive in a matter of years, later this century, or not until future centuries. Regardless of the initial timescale, once human-level machine intelligence is developed, a "superintelligent" system that "greatly exceeds the cognitive performance of humans in virtually all domains of interest" would most likely follow surprisingly quickly. Such a superintelligence would be very difficult to control.

While the ultimate goals of superintelligences could vary greatly, a functional superintelligence will spontaneously generate, as natural subgoals, "instrumental goals" such as self-preservation and goal-content integrity, cognitive enhancement, and resource acquisition. For example, an agent whose sole final goal is to solve the Riemann hypothesis (a famous unsolved mathematical conjecture) could create and act upon a subgoal of transforming the entire Earth into some form of computronium (hypothetical material optimized for computation) to assist in the calculation. The superintelligence would proactively resist any outside attempts to turn the superintelligence off or otherwise prevent its subgoal completion. In order to prevent such an existential catastrophe, it is necessary to successfully solve the "AI control problem" for the first superintelligence. The solution might involve instilling the superintelligence with goals that are compatible with human survival and well-being. Solving the control problem is surprisingly difficult because most goals, when translated into machine-implementable code, lead to unforeseen and undesirable consequences.

The owl on the book cover alludes to an analogy which Bostrom calls the "Unfinished Fable of the Sparrows". A group of sparrows decide to find an owl chick and raise it as their servant. They eagerly imagine "how easy life would be" if they had an owl to help build their nests, to defend the sparrows and to free them for a life of leisure. The sparrows start the difficult search for an owl egg; only "Scronkfinkle", a "one-eyed sparrow with a fretful temperament", suggests thinking about the complicated question of how to tame the owl before bringing it "into our midst". The other sparrows demur; the search for an owl egg will already be hard enough on its own: "Why not get the owl first and work out the fine details later?" Bostrom states that "It is not known how the story ends", but he dedicates his book to Scronkfinkle.

== Reception ==
The book ranked #17 on The New York Times list of best selling science books for August 2014. In the same month, business magnate Elon Musk made headlines by agreeing with the book that artificial intelligence is potentially more dangerous than nuclear weapons. Bostrom's work on superintelligence has also influenced Bill Gates's concern for the existential risks facing humanity over the coming century. In a March 2015 interview by Baidu's CEO, Robin Li, Gates said that he would "highly recommend" Superintelligence. According to the New Yorker, philosophers Peter Singer and Derek Parfit "received it as a work of importance". Sam Altman wrote in 2015 that the book is the best thing he has ever read on AI risks.

The science editor of the Financial Times found that Bostrom's writing "sometimes veers into opaque language that betrays his background as a philosophy professor" but convincingly demonstrates that the risk from superintelligence is large enough that society should start thinking now about ways to endow future machine intelligence with positive values. A review in The Guardian pointed out that "even the most sophisticated machines created so far are intelligent in only a limited sense" and that "expectations that AI would soon overtake human intelligence were first dashed in the 1960s", but the review finds common ground with Bostrom in advising that "one would be ill-advised to dismiss the possibility altogether".

Some of Bostrom's colleagues suggest that nuclear war presents a greater threat to humanity than superintelligence, as does the future prospect of the weaponisation of nanotechnology and biotechnology. The Economist stated that "Bostrom is forced to spend much of the book discussing speculations built upon plausible conjecture... but the book is nonetheless valuable. The implications of introducing a second intelligent species onto Earth are far-reaching enough to deserve hard thinking, even if the prospect of actually doing so seems remote." Ronald Bailey wrote in the libertarian Reason that Bostrom makes a strong case that solving the AI control problem is the "essential task of our age". According to Tom Chivers of The Daily Telegraph, the book is difficult to read but nonetheless rewarding. A reviewer in the Journal of Experimental & Theoretical Artificial Intelligence broke with others by stating the book's "writing style is clear" and praised the book for avoiding "overly technical jargon". A reviewer in Philosophy judged Superintelligence to be "more realistic" than Ray Kurzweil's The Singularity Is Near.

== See also ==
- Age of Artificial Intelligence
- AI alignment
- AI safety
- Future of Humanity Institute
- Human Compatible
- Life 3.0
- Philosophy of artificial intelligence
- The Precipice: Existential Risk and the Future of Humanity
- Superintelligence ban
