= Asilomar Conference =

Asilomar Conference may refer to:

- Asilomar Conference on Recombinant DNA, a conference organized by Paul Berg, Maxine Singer, and colleagues to discuss the potential biohazards and regulation of biotechnology (1975)
- Asilomar Conference on Beneficial AI, a conference organized by the Future of Life Institute to address and formulate principles of beneficial AI (2017)
