= Parallel Worlds, Parallel Lives =

- Genre: Documentary
- Based on: The Many Worlds by Hugh Everett
- Directed by: Louise Lockwood
- Presented by: Mark Oliver Everett
- Starring: Mark Oliver Everett; Max Tegmark
- Narrated by: Annie Mac
- Country of origin: United Kingdom
- Original language: English

Production
- Executive producer: Andrew Thompson
- Editors: Folko Boermans; Jon Neuburger
- Running time: 60 minutes
- Production company: BBC

Original release
- Release: 26 November 2007

Parallel Worlds, Parallel Lives is a BAFTA-winning television documentary broadcast in 2007 on BBC Scotland and BBC Four. In the documentary, American rock musician Mark Oliver Everett talks with physicists such as Max Tegmark and the former colleagues of his father—Hugh Everett—about his father's many-worlds interpretation of quantum mechanics. The documentary was shot and directed by Louise Lockwood and edited by Folko Boermans.

The American premiere screening was at the 2008 inaugural World Science Festival in New York City.

The documentary was shown in full before each concert during the 2008 world tour of Eels.

A petition was started to persuade the BBC to issue the documentary on DVD.

Parallel Worlds, Parallel Lives was broadcast in the United States on the PBS program Nova on 21 October 2008. The US version of the documentary features American voice actors for the narration. This version was available in DVD but has fallen out of print.

The British version of the documentary is narrated by Annie Mac. The NOVA version was narrated by journalist Stefanie E. Frame.

Everett called making the film "the single most rewarding experience of my life in many ways."
