= Ban Artificial Superintelligence Act =

Proposed US artificial intelligence bill

Ban Artificial Superintelligence Act of 2026
- Announced in: the 119th United States Congress

Legislative history
- Introduced in the Senate by Bernie Sanders (I–VT) on September 23, 2026

The Ban Artificial Superintelligence Act is a proposed United States congressional bill which would ban the creation of artificial superintelligence, defined as AI systems that exceed human abilities on most tasks or are capable of destroying humanity. The bill would regulate AI systems which have certain characteristics defined as precursors to developing artificial superintelligence, including the ability to perform recursive self-improvement. Additionally, the bill would pause development of advanced AI models until the creation of a new government agency tasked with monitoring AI companies and enforcing safety legislation. Companies that violate the ban could face judicial dissolution (sometimes called the "corporate death penalty"), and responsible individuals could face up to 20 years in jail.

The bill was announced by Senator Bernie Sanders (I-Vermont) and Representative Greg Casar (D-Texas) on September 3, 2026, and introduced in the Senate on September 23, 2026.

== See also ==
- Artificial general intelligence
- Regulation of AI in the United States
- Regulation of artificial intelligence
- Transparency in Frontier Artificial Intelligence Act
- Safe and Secure Innovation for Frontier Artificial Intelligence Models Act
