= Our Mathematical Universe =

2014 book by Max Tegmark

Our Mathematical Universe: My Quest for the Ultimate Nature of Reality
- Hardcover edition
- Author: Max Tegmark
- Language: English
- Subject: Physics
- Genre: Non-fiction
- Publisher: Knopf
- Publication date: January 7, 2014
- Publication place: United States
- Media type: Print (hardback)
- Pages: 432
- ISBN: 978-0307599803

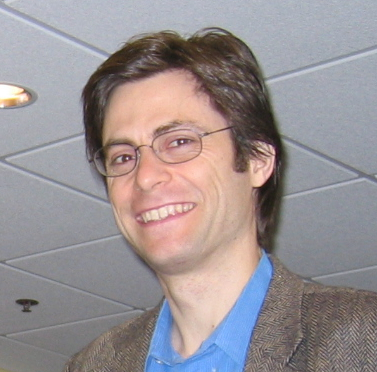
Professor Max Tegmark, author of Our Mathematical Universe

Our Mathematical Universe: My Quest for the Ultimate Nature of Reality is a 2014 non-fiction book by the Swedish-American cosmologist Max Tegmark. Written in popular science format, the book interweaves what a New York Times reviewer called "an informative survey of exciting recent developments in astrophysics and quantum theory" with Tegmark's mathematical universe hypothesis, which posits that reality is a mathematical structure. This mathematical nature of the universe, Tegmark argues, has important consequences for the way researchers should approach many questions of physics.

== Summary ==
Tegmark, whose background and scientific research have been in the fields of theoretical astrophysics and cosmology, mixes autobiography and humor into his analysis of the universe. The book begins with an account of a bicycle accident in Stockholm in which Tegmark was killed — in some theoretical parallel universes, though not in our own.

The rest of the book is divided into three parts. Part one, "Zooming Out", deals with locating ourselves in the cosmos and/or multiverse. Part two, "Zooming In", looks for added perspective from quantum mechanics and particle physics. Part three, "Stepping Back", interweaves a scientific viewpoint with Tegmark's speculative ideas about the mathematical nature of reality. By the end of the book, Tegmark has hypothesized four different levels of multiverse. Tegmark also extensively discusses Hugh Everett III's many-worlds interpretation, in addition to the universal wave function and other ideas proposed by Everett.

According to Andrew Liddle, reviewing the book for Nature:

The culmination that Tegmark seeks to lead us to is the "Level IV multiverse". This level contends that the Universe is not just well described by mathematics, but, in fact, is mathematics. All possible mathematical structures have a physical existence, and collectively, give a multiverse that subsumes all others. Here, Tegmark is taking us well beyond accepted viewpoints, advocating his personal vision for explaining the Universe.

== Reception ==
Reviews of the book have generally praised Tegmark's writing and exposition of established physics, while often criticizing the content and speculativeness of his new "mathematical universe" hypothesis.

In a very positive review, Clive Cookson in The Financial Times wrote that "physics could do with more characters like Tegmark" and that his book "should engage any reader interested in the infinite variety of nature." Giles Whitsell in The Times described the book as "mind-bending". Peter Forbes in The Independent praised the last chapter of the book, on the risks of extinction humanity faces, as "wise and bracing".

Brian Rotman, writing for The Guardian, was unconvinced by Tegmark's conclusions but also wrote that the book is "at the cutting edge of cosmology and quantum theory in friendly and relaxed prose, full of entertaining anecdotes and down-to-earth analogies." Similarly, cosmologist Andrew Liddle, in Nature, summarized:

This is a valuable book, written in a deceptively simple style but not afraid to make significant demands on its readers, especially once the multiverse level gets turned up to four. It is impressive how far Tegmark can carry you until, like a cartoon character running off a cliff, you wonder whether there is anything holding you up.

Mathematical physicist Edward Frenkel, writing for The New York Times, alleged that the meaning of Tegmark's hypothesis "is a big question, which is never fully answered" and said that parts of the book "[pretend] to stay in the realm of science" while actually espousing "science fiction and mysticism". In a positive review, cosmologist Andreas Albrecht, writing for SIAM Review, criticized Tegmark's proposed test of the "mathematical universe" hypothesis (the hypothetical identification of physical phenomena which cannot be described mathematically) as meaningless. In a review written for The Wall Street Journal, physicist Peter Woit said that the problem with Tegmark's proposal is "not that it's wrong but that it's empty" and "radically untestable". In Physics Today, Francis Sullivan particularly praised Tegmark's explanation of the theory of inflation but criticized his purportedly physical application of Emile Borel's theorem on normal numbers, and regarded his overall argument as circular. In New Scientist, Mark Buchanan contrasted what he saw as the "uninhibited speculation" in parts of Tegmark's book with his earlier "hard, empirical" work which established him as a physicist.

In The New York Times, science writer Amir Alexander concluded that the book is "brilliantly argued and beautifully written" and "never less than thought-provoking", although Tegmark's hypothesis is "simply too far removed from the frontiers of today's mainstream science" to judge its legitimacy.

== See also ==
- Mathematical universe hypothesis
