= Mathematical universe hypothesis =

Cosmological theory

In physics, cosmology, and metaphysics, the mathematical universe hypothesis (MUH), also known as the ultimate ensemble theory, is a speculative "theory of everything" (TOE) proposed by cosmologist Max Tegmark. According to the hypothesis, the universe is a mathematical object in and of itself. Tegmark extends this idea to hypothesize that all mathematical objects exist, which he describes as a form of Platonism or modal realism.

The hypothesis has proven controversial. Jürgen Schmidhuber argues that it is not possible to assign an equal weight or probability to all mathematical objects a priori due to there being infinitely many of them. Physicists Piet Hut and Mark Alford have suggested that the idea is incompatible with Gödel's first incompleteness theorem.

Tegmark replies that not only is the universe mathematical, but it is also computable.

In 2014, Tegmark published a popular science book about the topic, titled Our Mathematical Universe.

== Description ==
Tegmark's MUH is the hypothesis that our external physical reality is a mathematical structure. That is, the physical universe is not merely described by mathematics, but is mathematics—specifically, a mathematical structure. Mathematical existence equals physical existence, and all structures that exist mathematically exist physically as well. Observers, including humans, are "self-aware substructures (SASs)". In any mathematical structure complex enough to contain such substructures, they "will subjectively perceive themselves as existing in a physically 'real' world".

The theory can be considered a form of Pythagoreanism or Platonism in that it proposes the existence of mathematical entities; a form of mathematicism in that it denies that anything exists except mathematical objects; and a formal expression of ontic structural realism.

Tegmark claims that the hypothesis has no free parameters and is not observationally ruled out. Thus, he reasons, it is preferred over other theories-of-everything by Occam's Razor. Tegmark also considers augmenting the MUH with a second assumption, the computable universe hypothesis (CUH), which says that the mathematical structure that is our external physical reality is defined by computable functions.

The MUH is related to Tegmark's categorization of four levels of the multiverse. This categorization posits a nested hierarchy of increasing diversity, with worlds corresponding to different sets of initial conditions (level 1), physical constants (level 2), quantum branches (level 3), and altogether different equations or mathematical structures (level 4).

== Criticisms and responses ==
Andreas Albrecht when at Imperial College in London called it a "provocative" solution to one of the central problems facing physics. Although he "wouldn't dare" go so far as to say he believes it, he noted that "it's actually quite difficult to construct a theory where everything we see is all there is".

=== Definition of the ensemble ===
Jürgen Schmidhuber argues that "Although Tegmark suggests that '... all mathematical structures are a priori given equal statistical weight,' there is no way of assigning equal non-vanishing probability to all (infinitely many) mathematical structures." Schmidhuber puts forward a more restricted ensemble which admits only universe representations describable by constructive mathematics, that is, computer programs; e.g., the Global Digital Mathematics Library and Digital Library of Mathematical Functions, linked open data representations of formalized fundamental theorems intended to serve as building blocks for additional mathematical results. He explicitly includes universe representations describable by non-halting programs whose output bits converge after finite time, although the convergence time itself may not be predictable by a halting program, due to the undecidability of the halting problem.

In response, Tegmark notes that a constructive mathematics formalized measure of free parameter variations of physical dimensions, constants, and laws over all universes has not yet been constructed for the string theory landscape either, so this should not be regarded as a "show-stopper".

=== Consistency with Gödel's theorem ===
It has also been suggested that the MUH is inconsistent with Gödel's incompleteness theorem. In a three-way debate between Tegmark and fellow physicists Piet Hut and Mark Alford, the secularist (Alford) states that "the methods allowed by formalists cannot prove all the theorems in a sufficiently powerful system... The idea that math is 'out there' is incompatible with the idea that it consists of formal systems."

Tegmark's response is to offer a new hypothesis "that only Gödel-complete (fully decidable) mathematical structures have physical existence. This drastically shrinks the Level IV multiverse, essentially placing an upper limit on complexity, and may have the attractive side effect of explaining the relative simplicity of our universe." Tegmark goes on to note that although conventional theories in physics are Gödel-undecidable, the actual mathematical structure describing our world could still be Gödel-complete, and "could in principle contain observers capable of thinking about Gödel-incomplete mathematics, just as finite-state digital computers can prove certain theorems about Gödel-incomplete formal systems like Peano arithmetic." In he gives a more detailed response, proposing as an alternative to MUH the more restricted "Computable Universe Hypothesis" (CUH) which only includes mathematical structures that are simple enough that Gödel's theorem does not require them to contain any undecidable or uncomputable theorems. Tegmark admits that this approach faces "serious challenges", including (a) it excludes much of the mathematical landscape; (b) the measure on the space of allowed theories may itself be uncomputable; and (c) "virtually all historically successful theories of physics violate the CUH".

=== Observability ===
Stoeger, Ellis, and Kircher note that in a true multiverse theory, "the universes are then completely disjoint and nothing that happens in any one of them is causally linked to what happens in any other one. This lack of any causal connection in such multiverses really places them beyond any scientific support". Ellis specifically criticizes the MUH, stating that an infinite ensemble of completely disconnected universes is "completely untestable, despite hopeful remarks sometimes made, see, e.g., Tegmark (1998)." Tegmark maintains that MUH is testable, stating that it predicts (a) that "physics research will uncover mathematical regularities in nature", and (b) by assuming that we occupy a typical member of the multiverse of mathematical structures, one could "start testing multiverse predictions by assessing how typical our universe is".

=== Plausibility of radical Platonism ===
The MUH is based on the radical Platonist view that math is an external reality. However, Jannes argues that "mathematics is at least in part a human construction", on the basis that if it is an external reality, then it should be found in some other animals as well: "Tegmark argues that, if we want to give a complete description of reality, then we will need a language independent of us humans, understandable for non-human sentient entities, such as aliens and future supercomputers". Brian Greene argues similarly: "The deepest description of the universe should not require concepts whose meaning relies on human experience or interpretation. Reality transcends our existence and so shouldn't, in any fundamental way, depend on ideas of our making."

However, there are many non-human entities, plenty of which are intelligent, and many of which can apprehend, memorise, compare and even approximately add numerical quantities. Several animals have also passed the mirror test of self-consciousness. But a few surprising examples of mathematical abstraction notwithstanding (for example, chimpanzees can be trained to carry out symbolic addition with digits, or the report of a parrot understanding a "zero-like concept"), all examples of animal intelligence with respect to mathematics are limited to basic counting abilities. He adds, "non-human intelligent beings should exist that understand the language of advanced mathematics. However, none of the non-human intelligent beings that we know of confirm the status of (advanced) mathematics as an objective language." In the paper "On Math, Matter and Mind" the secularist viewpoint examined argues that math is evolving over time, there is "no reason to think it is converging to a definite structure, with fixed questions and established ways to address them", and also that "The Radical Platonist position is just another metaphysical theory like solipsism... In the end the metaphysics just demands that we use a different language for saying what we already knew." Tegmark responds that "The notion of a mathematical structure is rigorously defined in any book on Model Theory", and that non-human mathematics would only differ from our own "because we are uncovering a different part of what is in fact a consistent and unified picture, so math is converging in this sense." In his 2014 book on the MUH, Tegmark argues that the resolution is not that we invent the language of mathematics, but that we discover the structure of mathematics.

=== Coexistence of all mathematical structures ===
Don Page has argued that "At the ultimate level, there can be only one world and, if mathematical structures are broad enough to include all possible worlds or at least our own, there must be one unique mathematical structure that describes ultimate reality. So I think it is logical nonsense to talk of Level 4 in the sense of the co-existence of all mathematical structures." This means there can only be one mathematical corpus. Tegmark responds that "This is less inconsistent with Level IV than it may sound, since many mathematical structures decompose into unrelated substructures, and separate ones can be unified." Additionally, Page is assuming that there is an ultimate reality.

=== Consistency with our "simple universe" ===
Alexander Vilenkin comments that "The number of mathematical structures increases with increasing complexity, suggesting that 'typical' structures should be horrendously large and cumbersome. This seems to be in conflict with the beauty and simplicity of the theories describing our world". He goes on to note that Tegmark's solution to this problem, the assigning of lower "weights" to the more complex structures seems arbitrary ("Who determines the weights?") and may not be logically consistent ("It seems to introduce an additional mathematical structure, but all of them are supposed to be already included in the set").

=== Occam's razor ===
Tegmark has been criticized as misunderstanding the nature and application of Occam's razor; Massimo Pigliucci reminds that "Occam's razor is just a useful heuristic, it should never be used as the final arbiter to decide which theory is to be favored".

== See also ==
- Abstract object theory
- Anthropic principle
- Axiom Verge
- Church–Turing thesis
- Digital physics
  - Pancomputationalism
- Impossible world
- Mathematical structure
- Mathematicism
- Measure problem (cosmology)
- Modal realism
- Ontology
- Permutation City
- Structuralism (philosophy of science)
- "The Unreasonable Effectiveness of Mathematics in the Natural Sciences"
- Hilbert's sixth problem

== Sources ==
- Our Mathematical Universe: written by Max Tegmark and published on January 7, 2014, this book describes Tegmark's theory.
