= Killer robot =

Science fiction stock character

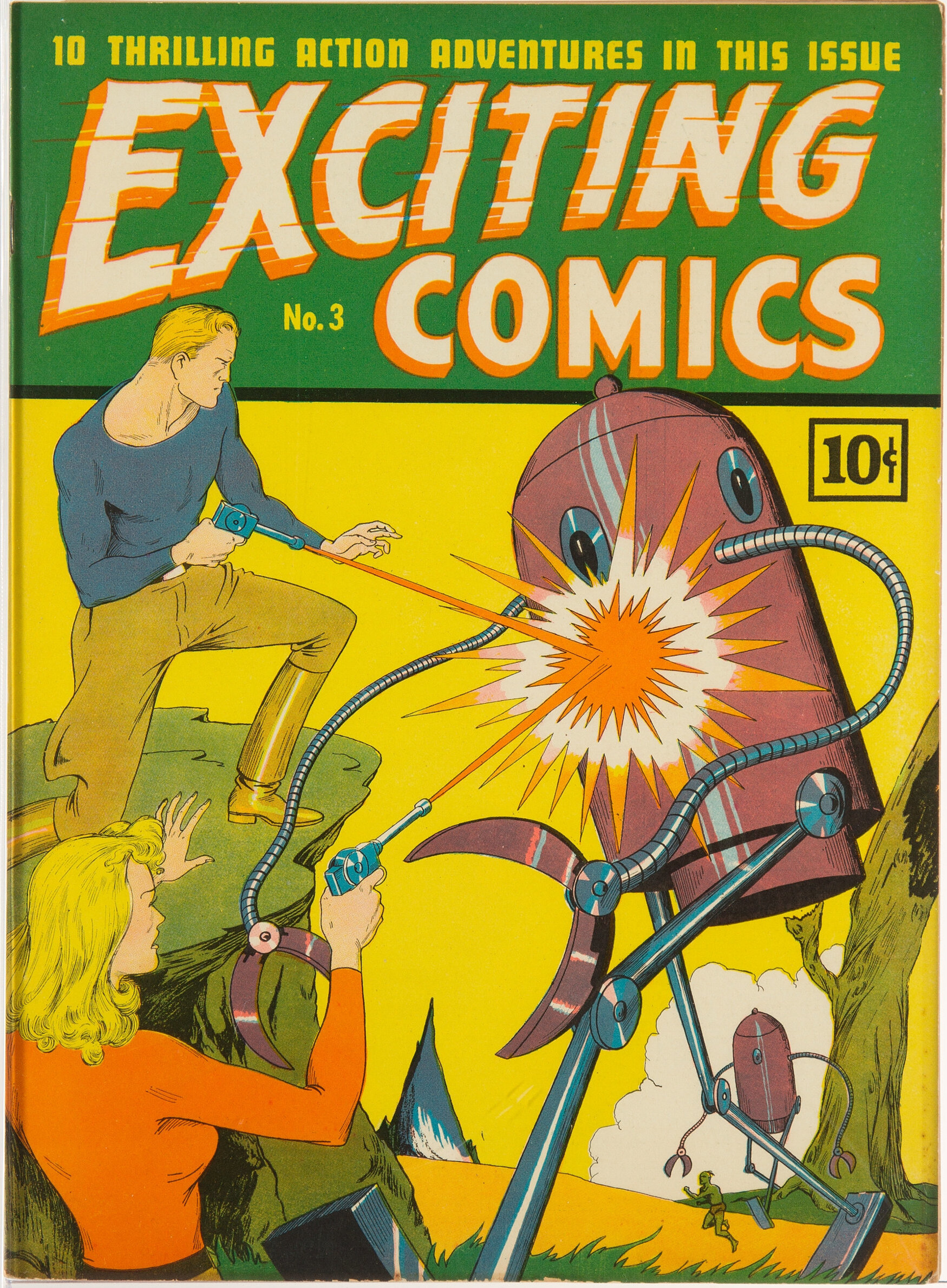
Pulp magazine depiction of humans fighting a group of killer robots.

Killer robots are a type of science fiction stock character - an artificially intelligent robot with homicidal tendencies, either deliberately programmed into them for the purposes of combat, or accidentally caused by an internal glitch or outside interference. They appear commonly in stories about robots, starting with R.U.R., a 1920 play that introduced the word "robot" into the English lexicon, in which artificial workers decide to rebel and subsequently cause the extinction of humanity. Some organizations, such as Human Rights Watch, have characterized real-life lethal autonomous weapons as "killer robots", while seeking to ban them. The depiction of killer robots reflects existential worry about the potential for harm robots possess.

== In science fiction ==
The 1920 play R.U.R. contains artificial beings that turn on their creators. Later, in 1942, Isaac Asimov wrote Runaround, a short story that introduced the Three Laws of Robotics, a hypothetical set of rules for robots, the first of which prohibits robots from harming humans, and the potential conflicts that may cause robots to disobey them.

Killer robots are often used as easy villains due to their disposable nature, where harming them is uncontroversial. Some that are widely known in popular culture include the Terminator, the sentient machines of The Matrix, and the malfunctioning androids in Westworld. The Machine Lifeforms in the 2017 video game Nier: Automata subvert the idea by depicting a race of sentient killer robots that became opposed to fighting, overthrew their alien creators, and instead began searching for the meaning of life.

== In real life ==
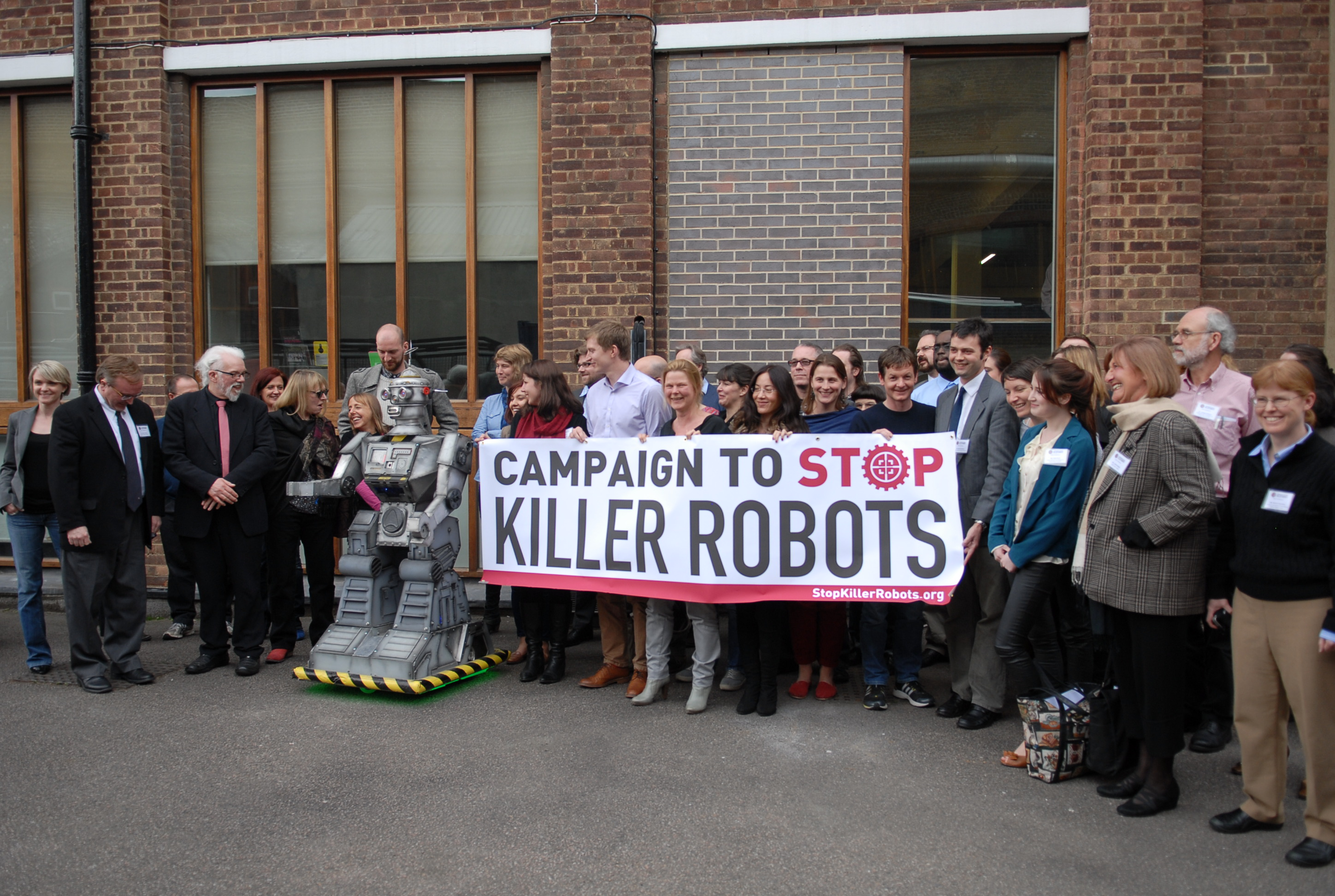
A group of anti-killer robot protesters.

While commonly used as a slang term for combat robots, the precise definition of "killer robot" is heavily debated. Loitering munitions have been described as real-life examples of killer robots due to their ability to hover autonomously above the battlefield until they find a target. Some believe all lethal autonomous weapons qualify as killer robots, but as of 2025 the UN has not defined “lethal autonomous weapon”. The existence of killer robots poses ethical concerns due to a lack of accountability when a robot kills and possibly misidentifies a target, such as believing a civilian is a soldier. They are also not covered under international criminal law. Many countries have refused to ban them due to the possibility they may have to use them in the future.

== See also ==
- AI takeover
- List of fictional military robots
- Existential risk from artificial intelligence
- Robot uprising
- Grey goo
