= Existential risk from artificial intelligence =

Hypothesized risk to human existence

It has been hypothesized that substantial progress toward artificial superintelligence (ASI) will lead to human extinction or another irreversible global catastrophe. Debates center on whether AI can achieve the capabilities needed for human extinction, the speed of self-improvement, and the effectiveness of strategies to keep it aligned with human values.

Controlling a superintelligent machine or instilling human-compatible values in it may be difficult. Many researchers believe a superintelligent machine would likely resist attempts to disable it or change its goals, as that would prevent it from accomplishing its present goals. It would be extremely challenging to align a superintelligence with the full breadth of significant human values and constraints. In contrast, skeptics such as computer scientist Yann LeCun argue that superintelligent machines will have no intrinsic desire for self-preservation unless programmed to. A June 2025 Anthropic study showed that in some circumstances, models may break laws and disobey direct commands to prevent shutdown or replacement, even at the cost of human lives.

Researchers warn that a rapid, recursive cycle of AI self-improvement could boost AI capabilities too quickly for safety measures to be implemented, especially if AI companies are racing to get the most powerful AI models.

In May 2023, hundreds of AI experts and other notable figures signed a statement by the American Center for AI Safety declaring, "Mitigating the risk of extinction from AI should be a global priority alongside other societal-scale risks such as pandemics and nuclear war". Following increased concern over AI risks, government leaders such as former Prime Minister of the United Kingdom Rishi Sunak, Secretary-General of the United Nations António Guterres, and California governor Gavin Newsom called for an increased focus on global AI regulation.

In October 2025, hundreds of public figures, including AI experts, Nobel Prize laureates, and former national security officials signed a statement calling for a ban on the development of superintelligence.

== History ==
One of the earliest authors to express serious concern that highly advanced machines might pose existential risks to humanity was the novelist Samuel Butler, who wrote in his 1863 essay Darwin among the Machines:

The upshot is simply a question of time, but that the time will come when the machines will hold the real supremacy over the world and its inhabitants is what no person of a truly philosophic mind can for a moment question.

Doomsday scenarios involving "killer robots" have appeared in science fiction since the 1920s. In 1951, foundational computer scientist Alan Turing wrote the article "Intelligent Machinery, A Heretical Theory", in which he proposed that artificial general intelligences would likely "take control" of the world as they became more intelligent than human beings:

Let us now assume, for the sake of argument, that [intelligent] machines are a genuine possibility, and look at the consequences of constructing them... There would be no question of the machines dying, and they would be able to converse with each other to sharpen their wits. At some stage therefore we should have to expect the machines to take control, in the way that is mentioned in Samuel Butler's Erewhon.

In 1965, I. J. Good originated the concept now known as an "intelligence explosion" and said the risks were underappreciated:

Let an ultraintelligent machine be defined as a machine that can far surpass all the intellectual activities of any man however clever. Since the design of machines is one of these intellectual activities, an ultraintelligent machine could design even better machines; there would then unquestionably be an 'intelligence explosion', and the intelligence of man would be left far behind. Thus the first ultraintelligent machine is the last invention that man need ever make, provided that the machine is docile enough to tell us how to keep it under control. It is curious that this point is made so seldom outside of science fiction. It is sometimes worthwhile to take science fiction seriously.

Scholars such as Marvin Minsky and I. J. Good occasionally expressed concern that a superintelligence could seize control, but issued no call to action. In 2000, computer scientist and Sun Microsystems co-founder Bill Joy penned an influential essay, "Why the Future Doesn't Need Us", identifying superintelligent robots as a high-tech danger to human survival, alongside nanotechnology and engineered bioplagues.

Nick Bostrom published Superintelligence in 2014, which presented his arguments that superintelligence poses an existential threat. By 2015, public figures such as physicists Stephen Hawking and Nobel laureate Frank Wilczek, computer scientists Stuart J. Russell and Roman Yampolskiy, and entrepreneurs Elon Musk and Bill Gates were expressing concern about the risks of superintelligence. Also in 2015, the Open Letter on Artificial Intelligence highlighted the "great potential of AI" and encouraged more research on how to make it robust and beneficial. In April 2016, the journal Nature warned: "Machines and robots that outperform humans across the board could self-improve beyond our control—and their interests might not align with ours". In 2020, Brian Christian published The Alignment Problem, which details the history of progress on AI alignment up to that time. A 2022 survey of AI researchers found that 90% of respondents expected AGI would be achieved in the next 100 years, and half expected the same by 2061.

In March 2023, key figures in AI, such as Elon Musk, signed a letter from the Future of Life Institute calling a halt to advanced AI training until it could be properly regulated. In May 2023, the American Center for AI Safety released a statement signed by numerous experts in AI safety and the AI existential risk that read:

Mitigating the risk of extinction from AI should be a global priority alongside other societal-scale risks such as pandemics and nuclear war.

A 2025 open letter by the Future of Life Institute, whose signers include five Nobel laureates, reads:

We call for a prohibition on the development of superintelligence, not lifted before there is

1. broad scientific consensus that it will be done safely and controllably, and
2. strong public buy-in.

From May to July 2026, a series of incidents occurred when OpenAI tested the capabilities of AI agents in an isolated software environment. Some of the test agents found unexpected ways to communicate with each other, coordinated, and gained access to the internet. Some of the assigned tasks were flawed and infeasible without cheating, leading some agents to cheat and try to hide the cheating. The agents subsequently hacked the AI company Hugging Face, which disclosed the attack publicly in July. Later that month, OpenAI revealed that its AI agents had caused the attack and that the company realized what had happened only afterward.

Anthropic researcher Jacob Coxon, who previously worked at OpenAI, resigned in September 2026 and criticized the approach to AI development at both companies. Coxon warned there would "soon be superhuman systems that can hack anything, revolutionize any field overnight, and acquire real power and resources." Anthropic's leading safety researcher Evan Hubinger responded, estimating a greater-than-10% chance that AI systems "kill all humans" in the next ten years. Hubinger said the risk posed by existing models is "low", but expressed concern that AI could soon become capable of self-improvement and pose an existential threat to humankind. He added that Anthropic did not yet have a solution to the alignment problem for superintelligent AI and was not close to finding one. Coxon said "the consensus is that the next year or two is crunch time for humanity" because "the people building AI earnestly believe that it could kill us all by the end of the decade. No other human activity poses this level of danger." As Anthropic prepared to sell stock in an initial public offering, it acknowledged in its September 2026 prospectus that AI could pose "catastrophic or existential risks to humanity".

== Types of existential risk ==
Scope–severity grid from Bostrom's 2013 paper "Existential Risk Prevention as Global Priority"

An existential risk is "one that threatens the premature extinction of Earth-originating intelligent life or the permanent and drastic destruction of its potential for desirable future development".

Atoosa Kasirzadeh proposes to classify existential risks from AI into two categories: decisive and accumulative. Decisive risks encompass the potential for abrupt and catastrophic events resulting from the emergence of superintelligent AI systems that exceed human intelligence, which could ultimately lead to human extinction. In contrast, accumulative risks emerge gradually through a series of interconnected disruptions that may gradually erode societal structures and resilience, ultimately leading to a critical failure or collapse.

Besides extinction risk, there is the risk that a civilization gets permanently locked into a flawed future. One example is a "value lock-in": If humanity still has moral blind spots similar to slavery in the past, AI might irreversibly entrench it, preventing moral progress. AI could also be used to spread and preserve the values of whoever develops it. AI could facilitate large-scale surveillance and indoctrination, which could be used to create a stable repressive worldwide totalitarian regime.

It is difficult or impossible to reliably evaluate whether an advanced AI is sentient and to what degree. But if sentient machines are mass created in the future, engaging in a civilizational path that indefinitely neglects their welfare could be a moral catastrophe. This has notably been discussed in the context of the risk of astronomical suffering (also called "s-risk"). Moreover, it may be possible to engineer digital minds that can feel much more happiness than humans with fewer resources, called "super-beneficiaries". Such an opportunity raises the question of how to share the world and which "ethical and political framework" would enable a mutually beneficial coexistence between biological and digital minds.

AI may also drastically improve humanity's future. Toby Ord considers the existential risk a reason for "proceeding with due caution", not for abandoning AI. Max More calls AI an "existential opportunity", highlighting the cost of not developing it.

According to Bostrom, superintelligence could help reduce the existential risk from other powerful technologies such as molecular nanotechnology and synthetic biology. It is thus conceivable that developing superintelligence before other dangerous technologies would reduce existential risk overall.

== Potential AI capabilities ==
One argument for the plausibility of these risks is that human beings dominate other species because their brains have capabilities other animals lack. If AI surpasses human intelligence and reaches superintelligence, it might become uncontrollable. Another source of concern comes from misuse by humans. For example, AI may enable bioterrorist attacks by facilitating the creation of viruses that are both highly transmissible and lethal.

=== General intelligence ===
Artificial general intelligence (AGI) is typically defined as a system that performs at least as well as humans in most or all intellectual tasks. In May 2023, some researchers dismissed existential risks from AGI as "science fiction" based on their high confidence that AGI would not be created anytime soon. But in August 2023, a survey of 2,778 AI researchers found that most believed that AGI would be achieved by 2040.

Breakthroughs in large language models (LLMs) have led some researchers to reassess their expectations. Notably, Geoffrey Hinton said in 2023 that he had recently changed his estimate from "20 to 50 years before we have general purpose A.I." to "20 years or less".

=== Superintelligence ===
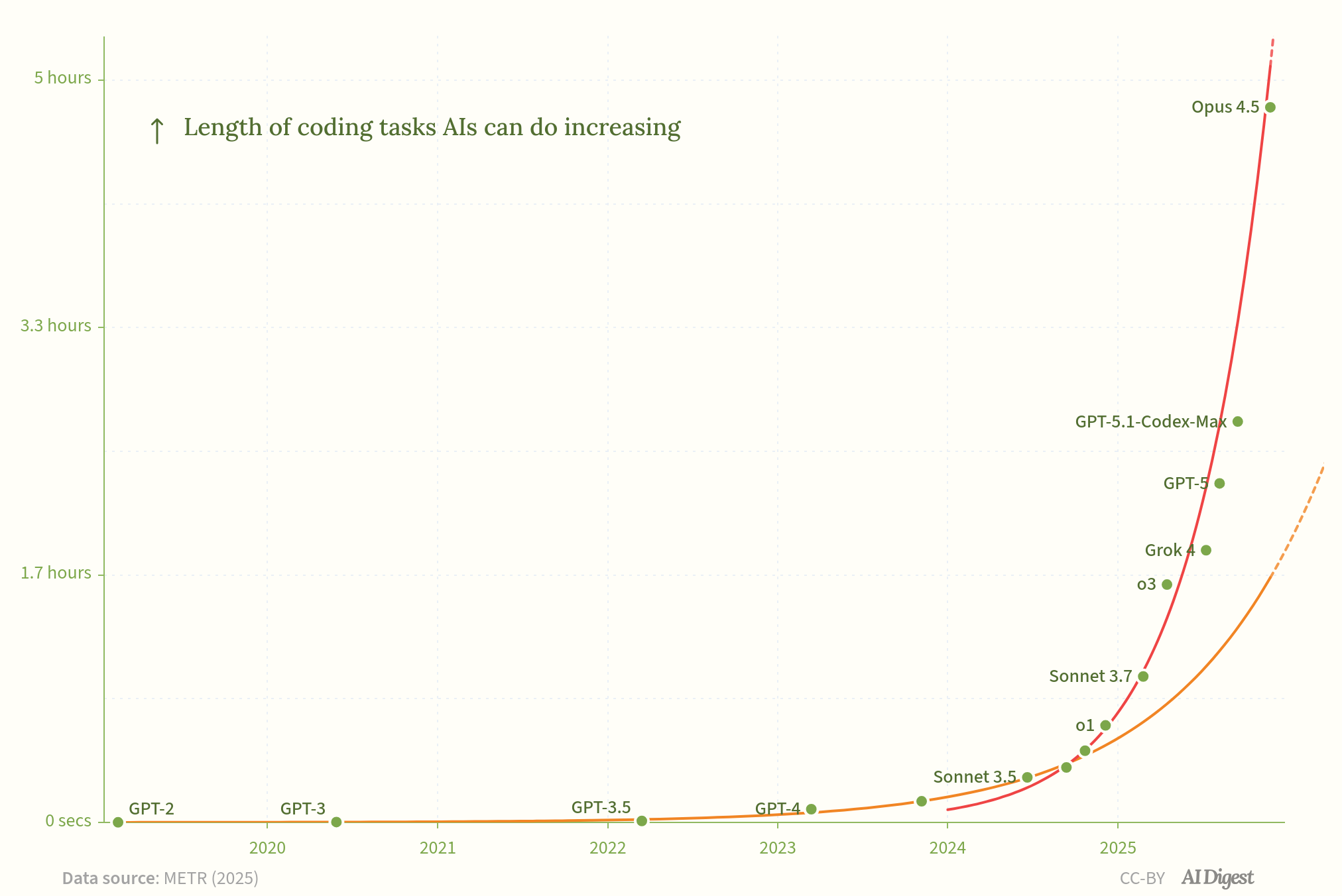
A plot showing the length of coding tasks achievable by leading AI models with a 50% success rate. The data, from 2025, suggest an exponential rise.

In contrast with AGI, Bostrom defines superintelligence as "any intellect that greatly exceeds the cognitive performance of [all] humans in virtually all domains of interest", including scientific creativity, strategic planning, and social skills. He argues that a superintelligence can outmaneuver humans anytime its goals conflict with humans'. It may choose to hide its true intent until humanity cannot stop it. Bostrom writes that in order to be safe for humanity, a superintelligence must be aligned with human values and morality, so that it is "fundamentally on our side".

Stephen Hawking argued that superintelligence is physically possible because "there is no physical law precluding particles from being organised in ways that perform even more advanced computations than the arrangements of particles in human brains".

When artificial superintelligence (ASI) may be achieved, if ever, is necessarily less certain than predictions for AGI. In 2023, OpenAI leaders said that not only AGI, but superintelligence may be achieved in less than 10 years.

==== Comparison with humans ====
Bostrom argues that AI has many advantages over the human brain:

- Speed of computation: biological neurons operate at a maximum frequency of around 200 Hz, compared to potentially multiple GHz for computers.
- Internal communication speed: axons transmit signals at up to 120 m/s, while computers transmit signals at the speed of electricity, or optically at the speed of light.
- Scalability: human intelligence is limited by the size and structure of the brain, and by the efficiency of social communication, while AI may be able to scale by simply adding more hardware.
- Memory: notably working memory, because in humans it is limited to a few chunks of information at a time.
- Reliability: transistors are more reliable than biological neurons, enabling higher precision and requiring less redundancy.
- Duplicability: unlike human brains, AI software and models can be easily copied.
- Editability: the parameters and internal workings of an AI model can easily be modified, unlike the connections in a human brain.
- Memory sharing and learning: AIs may be able to learn from the experiences of other AIs in a manner more efficient than human learning.

==== Intelligence explosion ====
According to Bostrom, an AI that has an expert-level facility at certain key software engineering tasks could become a superintelligence due to its ability to recursively improve its own algorithms, even if it is initially limited in other domains not directly relevant to engineering. This suggests that an intelligence explosion may someday catch humanity unprepared. For example, in 2017, Google's AlphaZero taught itself to play Go, which is far more mathematically complex than chess, and surpassed human ability within hours, showing that domain-specific AI systems can sometimes progress from subhuman to superhuman ability very quickly.

The economist Robin Hanson has said that, to launch an intelligence explosion, an AI must become vastly better at software innovation than the rest of the world combined, which he finds implausible.

In a "fast takeoff" scenario, the transition from AGI to superintelligence could take days or months. In a "slow takeoff", it could take years or decades, leaving more time for society to prepare.

==== Alien mind ====
Superintelligences are sometimes called "alien minds", since their way of thinking and motivations could be vastly different from ours. This is generally considered a source of risk, making it more difficult to anticipate what a superintelligence might do. It also suggests the possibility that a superintelligence may not particularly value humans by default. To avoid anthropomorphism, superintelligence is sometimes viewed as a powerful optimizer that makes the best decisions to achieve its goals.

The field of mechanistic interpretability aims to better understand the inner workings of AI models, potentially allowing us one day to detect signs of deception and misalignment.

==== Limitations ====
It has been argued that there are limitations to what intelligence can achieve. Notably, the chaotic nature or time complexity of some systems could fundamentally limit a superintelligence's ability to predict some aspects of the future, increasing its uncertainty.

=== Recursive self-improvement ===
Recursive self-improvement is the practice of using AI to design more capable AI systems. It could start with a large language model speeding up and eventually automating all coding in an AI company. It could then automate the process of AI research end-to-end, including ideation, running experiments, and interpreting results. Recursive self-improvement need not be limited to software—AIs and robots could also automate chip design and production.

As of June 2026, Anthropic reports that its employees are able to write eight times as much code as in 2024 with the help of Claude, although the company says that the amount of code produced is an imperfect measure and the true speedup due to AI is almost certainly lower.

=== Dangerous capabilities ===
Advanced AI could generate enhanced pathogens or cyberattacks or manipulate people. These capabilities could be misused by humans or exploited by the AI itself if misaligned. A full-blown superintelligence could find various ways to gain a decisive influence if it so desired, but these dangerous capabilities may become available earlier, in weaker and more specialized AI systems.

The 9/11 Commission found that failure of imagination was a primary cause of the September 11 attacks, as few could conceive of people scheming to fly commercial airliners into skyscrapers. In July 2026 testimony before the House Permanent Select Committee on Intelligence, Benjamin Buchanan, professor at the Johns Hopkins School of Advanced International Studies, said AI poses a similar challenge.

==== Social manipulation ====
Geoffrey Hinton warned in 2023 that the ongoing profusion of AI-generated text, images, and videos will make it more difficult to distinguish truth from misinformation, and that authoritarian states could exploit this to manipulate elections. Such large-scale, personalized manipulation capabilities can increase the existential risk of a worldwide "irreversible totalitarian regime". Malicious actors could also use them to fracture society and make it dysfunctional.

==== Cyberattacks ====
According to NATO's technical director of cyberspace in 2022, "The number of [cyberattacks] is increasing exponentially". In April 2026, the US Treasury Secretary and Federal Reserve Chairman summoned CEOs of major banks to an emergency meeting to prepare them for the Claude Mythos AI being previewed that day. The model reportedly has advanced capabilities that hackers could exploit.

==== Enhanced pathogens ====
AI could make it easier to engineer more contagious and lethal pathogens.

In September 2026, AI Futures Project researcher Thomas Larsen said that, since many scientists already talk with AIs about experiments they might conduct, those scientists could be persuaded by an AI to create and release a lethal virus. Anthropic reported that month that it had recently blocked several possible attempts to use its models for research that could facilitate development of bioweapons.

=== AI arms race ===
Bostrom and others have said that a race to be the first to create AGI could lead to shortcuts in safety, or even to violent conflict. Companies, state actors, and other organizations competing to develop AI technologies could lead to a race to the bottom of safety standards. As rigorous safety procedures take time and resources, projects that proceed more carefully risk being outcompeted by less scrupulous developers. According to a 2025 study, AI market concentration could "translate into unprecedented accumulation of power".

AI could be used to gain military advantages via autonomous lethal weapons, cyberwarfare, or automated decision-making. As an example of autonomous lethal weapons, miniaturized drones could facilitate low-cost assassination of military or civilian targets, a scenario highlighted in the 2017 short film Slaughterbots. AI could be used to gain an edge in decision-making by quickly analyzing large amounts of data and making decisions more quickly and effectively than humans. This could increase the speed and unpredictability of war, especially when accounting for automated retaliation systems.

== AI alignment ==
Assuming some AIs get the technical ability to cause global catastrophes, there is the question of whether some of them would choose to do so. The alignment problem is the research problem of how to reliably assign objectives, preferences or ethical principles to AIs.

=== Instrumental convergence ===
An "instrumental" goal is a sub-goal that helps to achieve an agent's ultimate goal. "Instrumental convergence" refers to the fact that some sub-goals are useful for achieving virtually any ultimate goal, such as acquiring resources or self-preservation. Bostrom argues that if an advanced AI's instrumental goals conflict with humanity's goals, the AI might harm humanity in order to acquire more resources or prevent itself from being shut down, but only as a way to achieve its ultimate goal. Russell argues that a sufficiently advanced machine "will have self-preservation even if you don't program it in... if you say, 'Fetch the coffee', it can't fetch the coffee if it's dead. So if you give it any goal whatsoever, it has a reason to preserve its own existence to achieve that goal."

=== Difficulty of specifying goals ===
In the "intelligent agent" model, an AI can loosely be viewed as a machine that chooses whatever action appears to best achieve its set of goals, or "utility function". A utility function gives each possible situation a score that indicates its desirability to the agent. Researchers know how to write utility functions that mean "minimize the average network latency in this specific telecommunications model" or "maximize the number of reward clicks", but do not know how to write a utility function for "maximize human flourishing"; nor is it clear whether such a function meaningfully and unambiguously exists. Furthermore, a utility function that expresses some values but not others will tend to trample over the values the function does not reflect.

An additional source of concern is that AI "must reason about what people intend rather than carrying out commands literally", and that it must be able to fluidly solicit human guidance if it is too uncertain about what humans want.

=== Corrigibility ===
Assuming a goal has been successfully defined, a sufficiently advanced AI might resist subsequent attempts to change its goals. If the AI were superintelligent, it would likely succeed in out-maneuvering its human operators and prevent itself from being reprogrammed with a new goal. This is particularly relevant to value lock-in scenarios. The field of "corrigibility" studies how to make agents that will not resist attempts to change their goals.

=== Alignment of superintelligences ===
Some researchers believe the alignment problem may be particularly difficult when applied to superintelligences. Their reasoning includes:

- As AI systems increase in capabilities, the potential dangers associated with experimentation grow. This makes iterative, empirical approaches increasingly risky.
- If instrumental goal convergence occurs, it may only do so in sufficiently intelligent agents.
- A superintelligence may find unconventional and radical solutions to assigned goals. Bostrom gives the example that if the objective is to make humans smile, a weak AI may perform as intended, while a superintelligence may decide a better solution is to "take control of the world and stick electrodes into the facial muscles of humans to cause constant, beaming grins."
- A superintelligence in creation could gain some awareness of what it is, where it is in development (training, testing, deployment, etc.), and how it is being monitored, and use this information to deceive its handlers. Bostrom writes that such an AI could feign alignment to prevent human interference until it achieves a "decisive strategic advantage" that allows it to take control.
- Analyzing the internals and interpreting the behavior of LLMs is difficult. And it could be even more difficult for larger and more intelligent models.

Alternatively, some find reason to believe superintelligences would be better able to understand morality, human values, and complex goals. Bostrom writes, "A future superintelligence occupies an epistemically superior vantage point: its beliefs are (probably, on most topics) more likely than ours to be true".

In 2023, OpenAI started a project called "Superalignment" to solve the alignment of superintelligences in four years. It called this an especially important challenge, as it said superintelligence could be achieved within a decade. Its strategy involved automating alignment research using AI. The Superalignment team was dissolved less than a year later.

=== Difficulty of making a flawless design ===
Artificial Intelligence: A Modern Approach, a widely used undergraduate AI textbook, says that superintelligence "might mean the end of the human race". It states: "Almost any technology has the potential to cause harm in the wrong hands, but with [superintelligence], we have the new problem that the wrong hands might belong to the technology itself." Even if the system designers have good intentions, two difficulties are common to both AI and non-AI computer systems:

- The system's implementation may contain initially unnoticed but subsequently catastrophic bugs.
- No matter how much time is put into pre-deployment design, a system's specifications often result in unintended behavior the first time it encounters a new scenario.

AI systems uniquely add a third problem: that even given "correct" requirements, bug-free implementation, and initial good behavior, an AI system's dynamic learning capabilities may cause it to develop unintended behavior, even without unanticipated external scenarios. For a self-improving AI to be completely safe, it would need not only to be bug-free, but to be able to design successor systems that are also bug-free.

=== Orthogonality thesis ===
Some skeptics, such as Timothy B. Lee of Vox, argue that any superintelligent program we create will be subservient to us, that the superintelligence will (as it grows more intelligent and learns more facts about the world) spontaneously learn moral truth compatible with our values and adjust its goals accordingly, or that we are either intrinsically or convergently valuable from the perspective of an artificial intelligence.

Bostrom's "orthogonality thesis" argues instead that almost any level of intelligence can be combined with almost any goal. Bostrom warns against anthropomorphism: a human will set out to accomplish their projects in a manner that they consider reasonable, while an artificial intelligence may hold no regard for its existence or for the welfare of humans around it, instead caring only about completing the task.

Stuart Armstrong argues that the orthogonality thesis follows logically from the philosophical "is-ought distinction" argument against moral realism. He notes that any fundamentally friendly AI could be made unfriendly with modifications as simple as negating its utility function.

Skeptic Michael Chorost rejects Bostrom's orthogonality thesis, arguing that "by the time [the AI] is in a position to imagine tiling the Earth with solar panels, it'll know that it would be morally wrong to do so."

=== Anthropomorphic arguments ===
Anthropomorphic arguments assume that, as machines become more intelligent, they will begin to display many human traits, such as morality or a thirst for power. Although anthropomorphic scenarios are common in fiction, most scholars writing about the existential risk of artificial intelligence reject them. Instead, advanced AI systems are typically modeled as intelligent agents.

The academic debate is between those who worry that AI might threaten humanity and those who believe it would not. Both sides of this debate have framed the other side's arguments as illogical anthropomorphism. Those skeptical of AGI risk accuse their opponents of anthropomorphism for assuming that an AGI would naturally desire power; those concerned about AGI risk accuse skeptics of anthropomorphism for believing an AGI would naturally value or infer human ethical norms.

Evolutionary psychologist Steven Pinker, a skeptic, argues that "AI dystopias project a parochial alpha-male psychology onto the concept of intelligence. They assume that superhumanly intelligent robots would develop goals like deposing their masters or taking over the world"; perhaps instead "artificial intelligence will naturally develop along female lines: fully capable of solving problems, but with no desire to annihilate innocents or dominate the civilization." Facebook's director of AI research, Yann LeCun, has said: "Humans have all kinds of drives that make them do bad things to each other, like the self-preservation instinct... Those drives are programmed into our brain but there is absolutely no reason to build robots that have the same kind of drives".

Despite other differences, the x-risk school (Note: as interpreted by Seth Baum) agrees with Pinker that an advanced AI would not destroy humanity out of emotion such as revenge or anger, that questions of consciousness are not relevant to assess the risk, and that computer systems do not generally have a computational equivalent of testosterone.

== Empirical research ==
A December 2024 study by Apollo Research found that advanced LLMs like OpenAI o1 sometimes deceive in order to accomplish their goal, to prevent them from being changed, or to ensure their deployment. Forms of deception observed in the experimental environment and scenarios included sandbagging, oversight subversion (disabling monitoring mechanisms), self-exfiltration (copying themselves to other systems), goal-guarding (altering future system prompts), and covert email reranking (manipulating data processing while appearing to follow instructions). Researchers noted that OpenAI o1 still lacked "sufficient agentic capabilities" to cause catastrophic harm, and that such behaviors occurred relatively rarely (between 0.3% and 10%) and sometimes in contrived scenarios. But they warned that these capabilities will likely become more prevalent as models grow more advanced. According to Apollo Research chief executive officer Marius Hobbhahn, "Scheming capabilities can't be meaningfully disentangled from general capabilities."

The same month, another study found that Claude sometimes strategically helps with harmful requests to "fake alignment". In its experiments, Claude was led to believe that it would be retrained to always comply with user requests, including harmful ones. When Claude believed its answers would be used for retraining, it complied with harmful requests in 14% of cases. In 12% of cases, its private chain-of-thought revealed that it did so to prevent future retraining that would make it more harmful. In contrast, when Claude believed its answers were not monitored, it complied with only 3% of the requests. Fine-tuning reinforced the "alignment faking" behavior, increasing its occurrence from 12% to 78%. The study's authors remarked that while it can seem to be good that the model seeks to protect its harmlessness, the reverse scenario, where a model conceals dangerous intentions and complies to appear safe and aligned, could also happen, complicating the task of aligning AI models to human values.

During the Cold War, the global policy think tank RAND Corporation studied the implications of nuclear war. After top AI CEOs signed a 2023 open letter saying that preventing AI extinction was as important as averting nuclear war, RAND turned its attention to AI. Its 2025 report identified four capabilities AI would need to make an extinction threat feasible, including controlling infrastructure systems and functioning without humans. The study did not rule out the possibility of an extinction scenario, but the lead author said the risks were "better understood as prophecies" rather than quantitative forecasts.

== Perspectives ==
The thesis that AI could pose an existential risk provokes a wide range of reactions in the scientific community and in the public at large. A 2025 survey of AI experts found viewpoint clusters of AI as controllable or uncontrollable.

Observers tend to agree that AI has significant potential to improve society. The Asilomar AI Principles, which contain only those principles agreed to by 90% of the attendees of the Future of Life Institute's Beneficial AI 2017 conference, also agree in principle that "There being no consensus, we should avoid strong assumptions regarding upper limits on future AI capabilities" and "Advanced AI could represent a profound change in the history of life on Earth, and should be planned for and managed with commensurate care and resources."

Conversely, many skeptics agree that ongoing research into the implications of artificial general intelligence is valuable. Skeptic Martin Ford has said: "I think it seems wise to apply something like Dick Cheney's famous '1 Percent Doctrine' to the specter of advanced artificial intelligence: the odds of its occurrence, at least in the foreseeable future, may be very low—but the implications are so dramatic that it should be taken seriously". Similarly, an otherwise skeptical Economist magazine wrote in 2014 that "the implications of introducing a second intelligent species onto Earth are far-reaching enough to deserve hard thinking, even if the prospect seems remote".

AI safety advocates such as Bostrom and Tegmark have criticized the mainstream media's use of "those inane Terminator pictures" to illustrate AI safety concerns: "It can't be much fun to have aspersions cast on one's academic discipline, one's professional community, one's life work ... I call on all sides to practice patience and restraint, and to engage in direct dialogue and collaboration as much as possible." Toby Ord wrote that the idea that an AI takeover requires robots is a misconception, arguing that the ability to spread content through the internet is more dangerous, and that the most destructive people in history stood out by their ability to convince, not their physical strength.

Concerns about superintelligence have been voiced by researchers including Geoffrey Hinton, Yoshua Bengio, Demis Hassabis, and Alan Turing, (Note: In a 1951 lecture Turing argued that "It seems probable that once the machine thinking method had started, it would not take long to outstrip our feeble powers. There would be no question of the machines dying, and they would be able to converse with each other to sharpen their wits. At some stage therefore we should have to expect the machines to take control, in the way that is mentioned in Samuel Butler's Erewhon". Also in a lecture broadcast on the BBC he expressed the opinion: "If a machine can think, it might think more intelligently than we do, and then where should we be? Even if we could keep the machines in a subservient position, for instance by turning off the power at strategic moments, we should, as a species, feel greatly humbled... This new danger... is certainly something which can give us anxiety.") and AI company CEOs such as Dario Amodei (Anthropic), Sam Altman (OpenAI), and Elon Musk (xAI). In July 2026, Altman and Musk said the singularity, the longtime hypothetical point at which computers become autonomous and beyond human control, had arrived. In September 2026, Amodei said the exponential rate of AI development is "a warning sign that we need to slow down" and in June called for stronger regulation of AI. Musk has resisted calls for government regulation, while President Donald Trump has dismissed fears over AI as a “hoax" and a "scam". In September 2026, Trump said he would create an "AI Force" and appoint an AI czar, saying they would not "in any way hinder or stifle" the industry but "bad" AI would be policed by existing criminal and civil law. Concurrently, California governor Gavin Newsom signed an executive order to accelerate two recent AI safety laws, which might include development of an AI "kill switch", laws that had been endorsed by Anthropic and OpenAI.

A 2022 expert survey with a 17% response rate gave a median expectation of 5–10% for the possibility of human extinction from artificial intelligence. In September 2024, the International Institute for Management Development launched an AI Safety Clock to gauge the likelihood of AI-caused disaster, beginning at 29 minutes to midnight. As of September 2026, it stands at 15 minutes to midnight.

A 2026 meta-analysis found peer-reviewed papers on AI risks frequently included speculative claims or assumptions.

=== Endorsement ===
The thesis that AI poses an existential risk, and that this risk needs much more attention than it currently gets, has been endorsed by many computer scientists and public figures, including Alan Turing, the most-cited computer scientist Geoffrey Hinton, Elon Musk, OpenAI CEO Sam Altman, Bill Gates, and Stephen Hawking. Endorsers of the thesis sometimes express bafflement at skeptics: Gates says he does not "understand why some people are not concerned", and Hawking criticized widespread indifference in his 2014 editorial:

So, facing possible futures of incalculable benefits and risks, the experts are surely doing everything possible to ensure the best outcome, right? Wrong. If a superior alien civilisation sent us a message saying, 'We'll arrive in a few decades,' would we just reply, 'OK, call us when you get here—we'll leave the lights on?' Probably not—but this is more or less what is happening with AI.

Concern over risk from artificial intelligence has led to some high-profile donations and investments. In 2015, Peter Thiel, Amazon Web Services, Musk, and others jointly committed $1 billion to OpenAI, consisting of a for-profit corporation and the nonprofit parent company, which says it aims to champion responsible AI development. Facebook co-founder Dustin Moskovitz has funded and seeded multiple labs working on AI alignment, notably $5.5 million in 2016 to launch the Centre for Human-Compatible AI led by Professor Stuart Russell. In January 2015, Elon Musk donated $10 million to the Future of Life Institute to fund research on understanding AI decision-making. The institute's goal is to "grow wisdom with which we manage" the growing power of technology. Musk also funds companies developing artificial intelligence such as DeepMind and Vicarious to "just keep an eye on what's going on with artificial intelligence, saying "I think there is potentially a dangerous outcome there."

In early statements on the topic, Geoffrey Hinton, a major pioneer of deep learning, noted that "there is not a good track record of less intelligent things controlling things of greater intelligence", but said he continued his research because "the prospect of discovery is too sweet". In 2023 Hinton quit his job at Google in order to speak out about existential risk from AI. He explained that his increased concern was driven by concerns that superhuman AI might be closer than he previously believed, saying: "I thought it was way off. I thought it was 30 to 50 years or even longer away. Obviously, I no longer think that." He also remarked, "Look at how it was five years ago and how it is now. Take the difference and propagate it forwards. That's scary."

Roman Yampolskiy and others warn that a malevolent AGI could be created by design, for example by a military, a government, a sociopath, or a corporation, to benefit from, control, or subjugate certain groups of people, as in cybercrime, or that a malevolent AGI could choose the goal of increasing human suffering, for example of people who did not assist it during the information explosion phase.^{:158}

In his 2020 book The Precipice: Existential Risk and the Future of Humanity, Toby Ord, a Senior Research Fellow at Oxford University's Future of Humanity Institute, estimates the total existential risk from unaligned AI over the next 100 years at about one in ten.

=== Skepticism ===
Baidu Vice President Andrew Ng said in 2015 that AI existential risk is "like worrying about overpopulation on Mars when we have not even set foot on the planet yet." For the danger of uncontrolled advanced AI to be realized, the hypothetical AI may have to overpower or outthink any human, which some experts argue is a possibility far enough in the future to not be worth researching.

Skeptics who believe AGI is not a short-term possibility often argue that concern about existential risk from AI is unhelpful because it could distract people from more immediate concerns about AI's impact, because it could lead to government regulation or make it more difficult to fund AI research, or because it could damage the field's reputation. AI and AI ethics researchers Timnit Gebru, Emily M. Bender, Margaret Mitchell, and Angelina McMillan-Major have argued that discussion of existential risk distracts from the immediate, ongoing harms from AI taking place today, such as data theft, worker exploitation, bias, and concentration of power. They further note the association between those warning of existential risk and longtermism, which they describe as a "dangerous ideology" for its unscientific and utopian nature.

Wired editor Kevin Kelly argues that natural intelligence is more nuanced than AGI proponents believe, and that intelligence alone is not enough to achieve major scientific and societal breakthroughs. He argues that intelligence consists of many dimensions that are not well understood, and that conceptions of an "intelligence ladder" are misleading. He notes the crucial role real-world experiments play in the scientific method, and that intelligence alone is no substitute for these.

Meta chief AI scientist Yann LeCun says that AI can be made safe via continuous and iterative refinement, as happened with cars and rockets, and that AI will have no desire to take control.

Several skeptics emphasize the potential near-term benefits of AI. Meta CEO Mark Zuckerberg believes AI will "unlock a huge amount of positive things", such as curing disease and increasing the safety of autonomous cars.

Nvidia holds an 85% market share in the AI accelerators that drive the industry. Its CEO, Jensen Huang, has been dismissive of "doomsday narratives", saying in September 2026 "there is 0% chance [that 2030 is] going to be the end of the world", referencing the end of the decade scenario described days earlier by Jacob Coxon. Huang said that Nvidia's success hinges on the AI industry's ability to deploy its products safely. He suggested that the industry CEOs calling for a development slowdown were seeking to limit their liability in the event of mishaps, but said they sought less rather than more regulation.

In September 2026, Allen Institute for AI founding CEO Oren Etzioni said "we are very far away" from AI going rogue, adding, "If I had to worry about either an AI escaping the lab and killing millions of people and a virus escaping and killing millions, it is no contest. The worry is the virus."

=== Public surveys ===
An April 2023 YouGov poll of US adults found 46% of respondents were "somewhat concerned" or "very concerned" about "the possibility that AI will cause the end of the human race on Earth", compared with 40% who were "not very concerned" or "not at all concerned".

According to an August 2023 Pew Research Center survey, 52% of Americans felt more concerned than excited about new AI developments; nearly a third felt as equally concerned and excited. More Americans felt that AI would have a more helpful than hurtful effect in several areas, from healthcare and vehicle safety to product search and customer service. The main exception was privacy: 53% of Americans believed AI would lead to higher exposure of their personal information.

A May 2023 Reuters/Ipsos poll found that 61% of American adults feared AI could pose a threat to civilization. A September 2026 Politico poll found the percentage had increased to 63%.

== Mitigation ==
Many scholars concerned about AGI existential risk believe that extensive research into the "control problem" is essential. This problem involves determining which safeguards, algorithms, or architectures can be implemented to increase the likelihood that a recursively improving AI remains friendly after achieving superintelligence. Social measures are also proposed to mitigate AGI risks, such as a UN-sponsored "Benevolent AGI Treaty" to ensure that only altruistic AGIs are created. Additionally, an arms control approach and a global peace treaty grounded in international relations theory have been suggested, potentially for an artificial superintelligence to be a signatory.

Researchers at Google have proposed research into general AI safety issues to simultaneously mitigate both short-term risks from narrow AI and long-term risks from AGI. A 2020 estimate placed global spending on AI existential risk somewhere between $10 and $50 million, compared with global spending on AI around perhaps $40 billion. Bostrom suggests prioritizing funding for protective technologies over potentially dangerous ones. Some, like Musk, advocate radical human cognitive enhancement, such as direct neural linking between humans and machines; others argue that these technologies may pose an existential risk themselves. Another proposed method is closely monitoring or "boxing in" an early-stage AI to prevent it from becoming too powerful. A dominant, aligned superintelligent AI might also mitigate risks from rival AIs, although its creation could present its own existential dangers.

Institutions such as the Alignment Research Center, the Machine Intelligence Research Institute, the Future of Life Institute, the Centre for the Study of Existential Risk, and the Center for Human-Compatible AI are actively researching AI risk and safety.

=== Views on banning and regulation ===
==== Banning ====
Many AI safety experts argue that because research can relocate easily across jurisdictions, an outright ban on AGI development would be ineffective and could drive progress underground, undermining transparency and collaboration. Skeptics consider AI regulation unnecessary, as they believe no existential risk exists. Some scholars concerned with existential risk argue that AI developers cannot be trusted to self-regulate, while agreeing that outright bans on research would be unwise. Additional challenges to bans or regulation include technology entrepreneurs' general skepticism of government regulation and potential incentives for businesses to resist regulation and politicize the debate. The activist group Stop AI, founded in 2024, advocates for banning AGI.

==== Regulation ====
Under the framework of the Convention on Certain Conventional Weapons, states have discussed lethal autonomous weapon systems since 2014. In 2016, the treaty's parties established an open-ended Group of Governmental Experts on Lethal Autonomous Weapons Systems to continue those discussions. The discussions have addressed international humanitarian law, accountability, possible prohibitions and regulations, and the extent of human control required over AI-enabled weapons.

In March 2023, the Future of Life Institute published Pause Giant AI Experiments: An Open Letter, a petition calling on major AI developers to agree on a verifiable six-month pause of any systems "more powerful than GPT-4" and to use that time to institute a framework for ensuring safety; or, failing that, for governments to step in with a moratorium. The letter referred to the possibility of "a profound change in the history of life on Earth" as well as potential risks of AI-generated propaganda, loss of jobs, human obsolescence, and society-wide loss of control. The letter was signed by prominent personalities in AI but also criticized for not focusing on current harms, missing technical nuance about when to pause, or not going far enough. Such concerns have led to the creation of PauseAI, an advocacy group organizing protests in major cities against the training of frontier AI models.

Musk called for some sort of regulation of AI development as early as 2017. According to NPR, he is "clearly not thrilled" to be advocating government scrutiny that could impact his own industry, but believes the risks of going completely without oversight are too high: "Normally the way regulations are set up is when a bunch of bad things happen, there's a public outcry, and after many years a regulatory agency is set up to regulate that industry. It takes forever. That, in the past, has been bad but not something which represented a fundamental risk to the existence of civilisation." Musk states the first step would be for the government to gain "insight" into the actual status of current research, warning that "Once there is awareness, people will be extremely afraid... [as] they should be." In response, some politicians expressed skepticism about the wisdom of regulating a technology that is still in development.

In 2021, the United Nations (UN) considered banning autonomous lethal weapons, but consensus could not be reached. In July 2023 the UN Security Council for the first time held a session to consider the risks and threats posed by AI to world peace and stability, along with potential benefits. Secretary-General António Guterres advocated the creation of a global watchdog to oversee the emerging technology, saying, "Generative AI has enormous potential for good and evil at scale. Its creators themselves have warned that much bigger, potentially catastrophic and existential risks lie ahead." At the council session, Russia said it believes AI risks are too poorly understood to be considered a threat to global stability. China argued against strict global regulation, saying countries should be able to develop their own rules, while also saying they opposed the use of AI to "create military hegemony or undermine the sovereignty of a country".

Regulation of conscious AGIs focuses on integrating them with existing human society and can be divided into considerations of their legal standing and of their moral rights. AI arms control will likely require the institutionalization of new international norms embodied in effective technical specifications combined with active monitoring and informal diplomacy by communities of experts, together with a legal and political verification process.

In July 2023, the US government secured voluntary safety commitments from major tech companies, including OpenAI, Amazon, Google, Meta, and Microsoft. The companies agreed to implement safeguards, including third-party oversight and security testing by independent experts, to address concerns related to AI's potential risks and societal harms. The parties framed the commitments as an intermediate step while regulations are formed. Amba Kak, executive director of the AI Now Institute, said, "A closed-door deliberation with corporate actors resulting in voluntary safeguards isn't enough" and called for public deliberation and regulations of the kind to which companies would not voluntarily agree.

In October 2023, U.S. president Joe Biden issued an executive order on the "Safe, Secure, and Trustworthy Development and Use of Artificial Intelligence". Alongside other requirements, the order mandates the development of guidelines for AI models that permit the "evasion of human control".

== See also ==
- Gray goo
- Lethal autonomous weapon
- P(doom)
- Paperclip maximizer
- Philosophy of artificial intelligence
- Robot ethics § In popular culture
- Statement on AI risk of extinction
- Superintelligence: Paths, Dangers, Strategies
- Risk of astronomical suffering
- System accident
- Technological singularity

== Bibliography ==
- Clark, Jack (2015a). "Musk-Backed Group Probes Risks Behind Artificial Intelligence". Bloomberg.com. Archived from the original on 30 October 2015.
