= Atoosa Kasirzadeh =

Artificial intelligence researcher

- آتوسا کثیرزاده
- Kasirzadeh speaking
- Awards: Schmidt Sciences AI2050 Early Career Fellowship

Education
- Education: Amirkabir University of Technology (BSc); KTH Royal Institute of Technology (MSc); Polytechnique Montréal (PhD); University of Toronto (PhD)
- Theses: Optimisation intégrée des rotations et des blocs mensuels personnalisés des équipages en transport aérien (2015); Applying Mathematics to the Natural and Social World (2021)

Philosophical work
- Era: Contemporary philosophy
- Institutions: Google DeepMind; Carnegie Mellon University
- Main interests: Philosophy of artificial intelligence; AI safety; AI ethics; Philosophy of technology; Philosophy of mathematics
- Notable works: Two Types of AI Existential Risk: Decisive and Accumulative
- Notable ideas: Decisive and accumulative AI-risk distinction
- Website: kasirzadeh.org

Atoosa Kasirzadeh (Persian: آتوسا کثیرزاده) is a philosopher and artificial intelligence researcher whose work concerns AI safety, AI governance, value alignment and the social effects of artificial intelligence.. She is a staff research scientist at Google DeepMind and an assistant professor of philosophy at Carnegie Mellon University, where she is on leave.

Kasirzadeh developed the distinction between decisive and accumulative forms of existential risk from AI. Her accumulative model describes how interconnected technological and social harms could gradually weaken institutions and social systems until a further disruption produces cascading failures.

== Education and career ==
Kasirzadeh holds a bachelor of industrial engineering from Amirkabir University of Technology. She subsequently received a master of System and Production Engineering and Management from KTH Royal Institute of Technology. As part of her master's program, she conducted thesis research in operations research at the École Polytechnique Fédérale de Lausanne (EPFL).

Kasirzadeh received a PhD in applied mathematics from Ecole Polytechnique de Montreal in 2015. Her dissertation, Optimisation intégrée des rotations et des blocs mensuels personnalisés des équipages en transport aérien, concerned mathematical models and computational algorithms for large-scale decision-making, including the scheduling of airline crews.

She received her second PhD in Philosophy of Science and Technology from the University of Toronto with the dissertation Applying Mathematics to the Natural and Social World in 2021.

Kasirzadeh was a postdoctoral research fellow with the Humanising Machine Intelligence project at the Australian National University. In 2021, she joined the University of Edinburgh as a Chancellor's Fellow in philosophy and subsequently served as director of research at its Centre for Technomoral Futures. She also worked as a research lead at the Alan Turing Institute.

Kasirzadeh joined Carnegie Mellon University in December 2024 as an assistant professor in the Department of Philosophy, with an additional appointment in the Software and Societal Systems Department. In 2026, she joined Google DeepMind full-time as a staff research scientist studying the implications of artificial general intelligence for human life, science and society, while taking leave from Carnegie Mellon.

== Research ==
==== Accumulative risks of AI ====
In contrast to the two widely dominant worldviews about AI, a) the normalist view, expounded by scientists such as Arvind Narayanan and Sayash Kapoor, AI is a normal technology whose control does not require major policy changes, and b) the superintelligence view, propounded by Eliezer Yudkowsky and Nate Soares, AI is a superintelligence that "would kill us all", Kasirzadeh formulates an alternative, accumulative view according to which “the gradual accumulation of smaller, seemingly non-existential, AI risks eventually surpassing critical thresholds.” Which could therefore threaten democratic institutions, markets and social trust networks.

Kasirzadeh classifies existential risks from AI into two categories: decisive and accumulative. Decisive risks encompass the potential for abrupt and catastrophic events resulting from the emergence of superintelligent AI systems that exceed human intelligence, which could ultimately lead to human extinction. In contrast, accumulative risks emerge gradually through a series of interconnected disruptions that may gradually erode societal structures and resilience over time, ultimately leading to a critical failure or collapse.

In its analysis of competing approaches to AI risk, Vox described Kasirzadeh as among the first philosophers to propose a comprehensive alternative to both the view of AI as ordinary technology and scenarios in which superintelligent AI produces an immediate catastrophe. Journalist Sigal Samuel discussed Kasirzadeh's framework as a systems-based account in which misinformation, surveillance, economic disruption, discrimination and failures of critical infrastructure could combine to produce cascading crises.

Kasirzadeh has proposed monitoring risks across individual social and technical subsystems while also maintaining central oversight of advanced AI development. Her approach emphasizes strengthening the resilience of institutions rather than treating present-day social harms and longer-term catastrophic risks as unrelated problems.

==== Threat of AI-generated journalism ====
Since "truth or objectivity in journalism is difficult to define in AI models", Kasirzadeh argues, large media organizations focus on "ethics and transparency" to build their reputation, instead of relying on "the myth of objectivity" which she sees as difficult to achieve.

==== Artificial agency ====
In a chapter co-authored with philosopher Victoria McGeer, Kasirzadeh examined whether artificial systems can possess intelligent capacities. They distinguished object-centred dispositions from agent-based dispositions and compared systems governed primarily by logical rules with systems that learn through reinforcement.

Editors William A. Bauer and Anna Marmodoro described the chapter as arguing that reinforcement-learning systems, unlike systems operating principally through fixed logical rules, may possess agent-based capacities. They connected the argument to broader philosophical questions about intelligent agency and responsibility.

==== Language-model risks ====
Kasirzadeh contributed to research categorizing the ethical and social risks posed by large language models. A 2022 paper presented a taxonomy of 21 risks across six areas: discrimination and exclusion, information hazards, misinformation, malicious use, human–computer interaction, and environmental and socioeconomic harms.

Her research at Carnegie Mellon has also addressed AI value alignment: the problem of defining and incorporating human values and social contexts into the design and governance of AI systems. Her AI2050 fellowship project applied ideas from philosophy, systems theory and game theory to value alignment in large language models.

== Selected Works ==
=== Edited Books ===
- Nyholm, Sven; Kasirzadeh, Atoosa; Zerilli, John, eds. (2026). Contemporary Debates in the Ethics of Artificial Intelligence. Wiley. doi:10.1002/9781394258840. ISBN 978-1-394-25881-9.

=== Articles and chapters ===
- Kasirzadeh, Atoosa (2025). "Two types of AI existential risk: decisive and accumulative". Philosophical Studies. 182 (7): 1975–2003. arXiv:2401.07836. doi:10.1007/s11098-025-02301-3.
- Kasirzadeh, Atoosa; McGeer, Victoria (2024). "Intelligent capacities in artificial systems". In Bauer, William A.; Marmodoro, Anna (eds.). Artificial Dispositions: Investigating Ethical and Metaphysical Issues. Bloomsbury Academic. ISBN 978-1-3503-3611-7.
- Kasirzadeh, Atoosa; Gabriel, Iason (2023). "In conversation with artificial intelligence: Aligning language models with human values". Philosophy & Technology. 36 (2). Article 27. arXiv:2209.00731. doi:10.1007/s13347-023-00606-x.

== Honours and service ==
- 2023: Schmidt Sciences AI2050 Early Career Fellow
- Jan 2022 to June 2024: Chancellor's Fellow and Research lead at the University of Edinburgh's Centre for Technomoral Futures (CTMF).
- Aug — Dec 2021: Visiting researcher working on Ethics and Safety of Large Language Models at Google DeepMind
- 2020— 2021: Postdoctoral Research Fellow for the Humanizing Machine Intelligence Grand Challenge at the Australian National University.
- DCMS/UKRI Senior Policy Fellow
- Fellow at the Centre for AI Governance
- 2023–2027: Steering Committee Member for the ACM FAccT conference
- Group Research Lead at the Alan Turing Institute
- 2025–2027: Member of the World Economic Forum's Global Future Council on Artificial General Intelligence.
