= Asilomar Conference on Beneficial AI =

AI conference in California

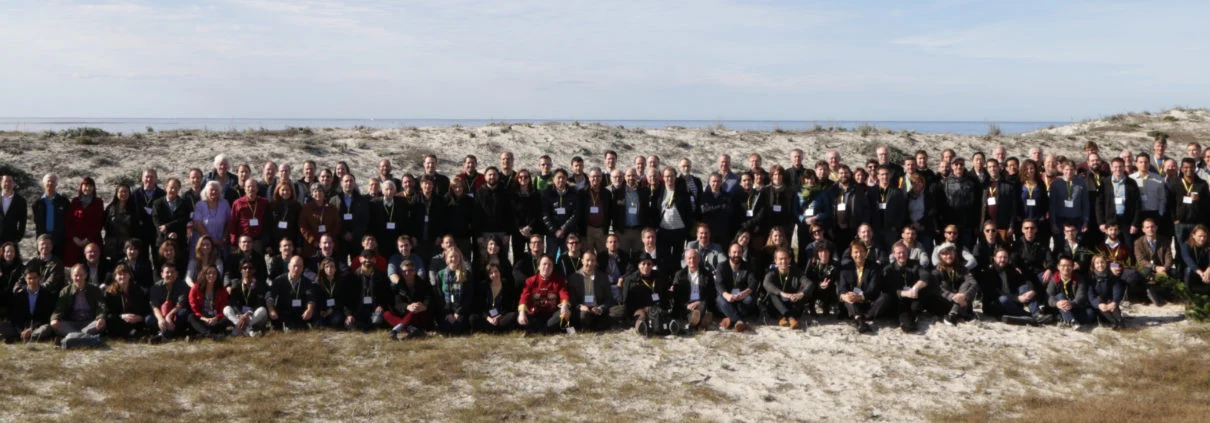
Participants at the Asilomar Conference on Beneficial AI

The Asilomar Conference on Beneficial AI was a conference organized by the Future of Life Institute, held January 5–8, 2017, at the Asilomar Conference Grounds in California. More than 100 thought leaders and researchers in economics, law, ethics, and philosophy met at the conference, to address and formulate principles of beneficial AI. Its outcome was the creation of a set of guidelines for AI research – the 23 Asilomar AI Principles.

The 23 principles, published as an open letter, received signatures from 1797 AI–Robotics researchers and 3923 others. Notable signatures included: Elon Musk, Stephen Hawking, executive director of the ACLU Anthony D. Romero, Dutch politician Kees Verhoeven, British tech entrepreneur Tabitha Goldstaub, American filmmaker James Barrat, CEO of Google Deepmind Demis Hassabis, AI researchers Ilya Sutskever, Yann LeCun, Yoshua Bengio, Dario Amodei, Max Tegmark, Eliezer Yudkowsky, and Stuart Russell, philosophers Sam Harris and Will MacAskill, and actor Joseph Gordon-Levitt, amongst others.
