= Stop AI =

American activist organization

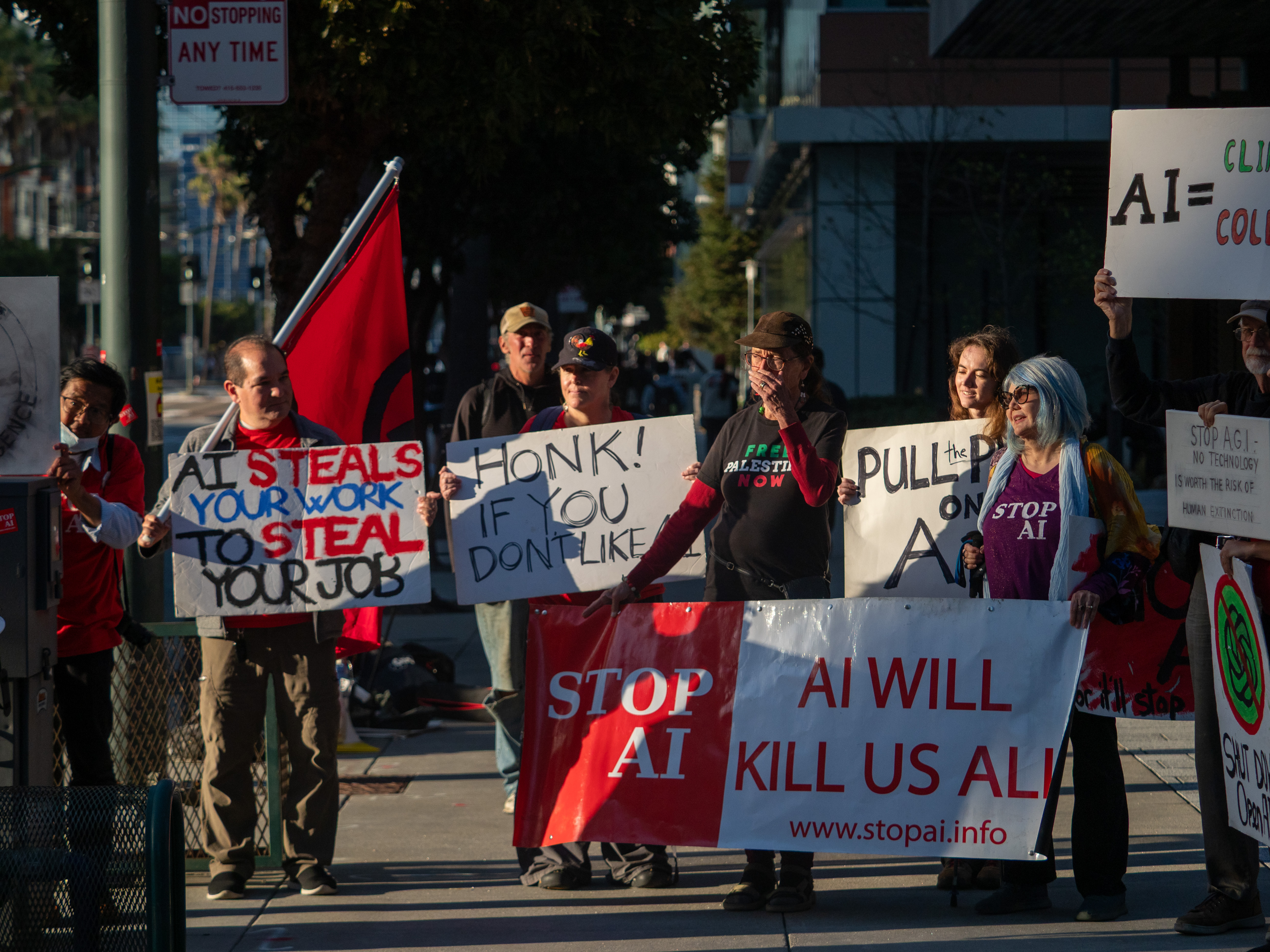
Stop AI protesters in 2025

Stop AI is an American activist organization formed in 2024. Based in Oakland, California, it seeks to ban the development of artificial general intelligence, a hypothetical technology being researched by some companies, including OpenAI.

Some Stop AI members have been arrested for blocking doors to OpenAI offices as protest. In November 2025, the San Francisco Public Defender's Office delivered a subpoena to Sam Altman, as part of an ongoing trial of Stop AI members, while Altman appeared on stage at a public event.

According to a Stop AI leader, in late 2025 Stop AI co-founder Sam Kirchner punched him due to disagreement about the organization; Kirchner was subsequently expelled from the group, and disappeared days later.

OpenAI and local police were contacted by Stop AI themselves following Kirchner's disappearance, due to their fears of a potentially violent attack by Kirchner on the company, causing the lockdown of San Francisco offices. No attack on OpenAI offices materialized, and Sam Kirchner remained missing as of July 2026.
