= Diyi Yang =

Chinese computer scientist

- Education: Carnegie Mellon University (Ph.D., 2019), Shanghai Jiao Tong University (B.S., 2013)
- Awards: Forbes 30 Under 30 (2021); NSF CAREER Award (2022)
- Scientific career
- Fields: Natural Language Processing, Computational Linguistics, Computational social science, Social computing
- Workplaces: Stanford University (2022–), Georgia Tech (2019–2022)
- Doctoral advisor: Robert E. Kraut, Eduard Hovy
- Website: nlp.stanford.edu/~diyiy/

Diyi Yang is a Chinese computer scientist and assistant professor of computer science at Stanford University. Her research is in human-centered AI, where she focuses on building natural language processing systems that support both human-human and human-computer interaction. She is affiliated with the Stanford NLP and HCI groups, as well as the Stanford AI Lab (SAIL) and the Stanford Institute for Human-Centered Artificial Intelligence (HAI).

== Biography ==
Diyi Yang attended Shanghai Jiao Tong University for her undergraduate studies, earning a Bachelor of Science degree in Computer Science in July 2013. She received an M.S. (May 2015) and Ph.D. (February 2019) degrees from Carnegie Mellon University Language Technologies Institute. For her dissertation work, Yang developed algorithms for understanding computational social roles by bringing together machine learning techniques with sociology and social psychology. Upon completing her PhD, Yang became an assistant professor at the Georgia Tech College of Computing. In 2022, Yang moved to Stanford University where she now leads the Social and Language Technologies (SALT) Lab.

== Recognition ==
Diyi Yang is a Sloan Research Fellow, Kavli Fellow, and Microsoft Research Faculty Fellow. In 2020, Yang was named one of IEEE AI's 10 to Watch, and in 2021, she was awarded Samsung AI Researcher of the Year, Intel Rising Star, and was listed in the Forbes 30 Under 30 for Science.
