= Max Tegmark =

Swedish-American academic physicist (born 1967)

- Tegmark in 2025
- Born: Max Erik Shapiro; 5 May 1967 (age 59); Stockholm, Sweden
- Education: Stockholm School of Economics (BA); Royal Institute of Technology (MSE); University of California, Berkeley (MA, PhD)
- Scientific career
- Fields: Cosmology, physics, machine learning
- Workplaces: Massachusetts Institute of Technology; Future of Life Institute
- Thesis: Probes of the Early Universe (1994)
- Doctoral advisor: Joseph Silk

Signature
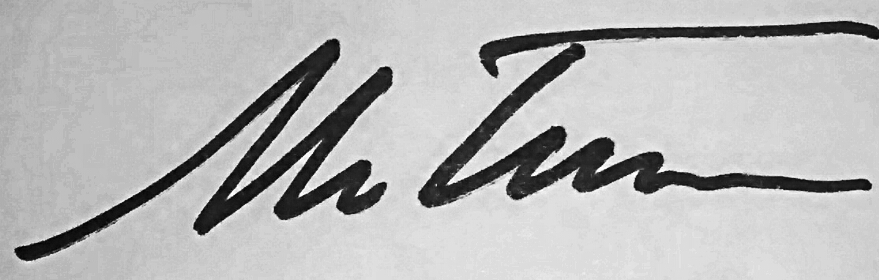

Max Tegmark (born 5 May 1967) is a Swedish-American physicist, machine learning researcher and author. He is a professor of physics at the Massachusetts Institute of Technology. He co-founded and leads the Future of Life Institute, a nonprofit focused on reducing global catastrophic risks from advanced technologies.

Originally a cosmologist, Tegmark's focus shifted toward artificial intelligence (AI). His 2017 book Life 3.0 presents scenarios for what the world might look like as AI continues to develop. Tegmark advocates for a halt on the development of artificial superintelligence.

== Early life ==
Max Erik Tegmark was born Max Erik Shapiro in Stockholm, Sweden, on 5 May 1967, to Karin Tegmark and mathematician Harold S. Shapiro.

Tegmark grew up in Bromma, Stockholm. During his studies at Blackeberg's high school, he worked as a volunteer for the Swedish Peace and Arbitration Society, campaigning for nuclear disarmament.

While studying at the University of California at Berkeley, he adopted his mother's surname Tegmark, as there were many astronomers named Shapiro, including one of his professors. While in high school, Tegmark and a friend, Magnus Bodin, created and sold a word processor, Teddy, written in machine code for the Swedish eight-bit computer ABC 80 as a summer project, which was marketed "in a very modest manner" by Liber Läromedel, and—per Tegman's autobiographical description—he also coded a 3D Tetris-like game called Frac.

Tegmark left Sweden after receiving his B.A. in economics in 1989 at the Stockholm School of Economics, and an M.S.E in engineering physics from the KTH Royal Institute of Technology in 1990. He next studied physics at the University of California, Berkeley, earning his M.A. in 1992, and Ph.D. in 1994 under the supervision of Joseph Silk.

== Career ==
Tegmark began as an assistant professor at the University of Pennsylvania, receiving tenure in 2003. In 2004, he joined the Massachusetts Institute of Technology's department of physics.

Tegmark is a professor of physics at the Massachusetts Institute of Technology. He is the president of the Future of Life Institute, a nonprofit he co-founded with Anthony Aguirre, a professor at the University of California, Santa Cruz.

== Research ==
=== Cosmology ===
Tegmark has worked on precision cosmology, which combines "theoretical work with new measurements to place sharp constraints on cosmological models and their free parameters". He has developed data analysis tools based on information theory and applied them to cosmic microwave background experiments such as COBE, QMAP, and WMAP, and to galaxy redshift surveys such as the Las Campanas Redshift Survey, the 2dF Survey and the Sloan Digital Sky Survey.

Alongside Daniel Eisenstein and Wayne Hu, he introduced in 1998 in The Astrophysical Journal the idea of using baryon acoustic oscillations as a standard ruler. His 2000 paper in Physical Review E, on quantum decoherence of neurons, concluded that decoherence is too rapid for Roger Penrose's orchestrated objective reduction ("quantum microtubule") model of consciousness to be viable. Working with Angelica de Oliveira-Costa and Andrew Hamilton, Tegmark reported in 2003 the discovery of the anomalous multipole alignment in the WMAP data, sometimes referred to as the "axis of evil". Tegmark also proposed in 2007 the mathematical universe hypothesis, which postulates that the physical universe is a mathematical structure. Mathematician Edward Frenkel characterized the mathematical universe hypothesis as "science fiction and mysticism" rather than science.

=== Journalism ===
Tegmark led a research project at MIT, beginning in 2020, focused on the application of machine learning to the classification of news reports. They called the AI-driven news aggregator "Improving the News". To maintain and scale the work, Tegmark and his wife and colleague Meia Chita-Tegmark founded the eponymous Improve the News Foundation (ITN) as an "apolitical" 501(c)(3) nonprofit in October 2020, with the stated mission to help "readers rise above controversies and understand the world in a nuanced way." The ITN product was rebranded as "Verity News" in 2023.

=== Machine learning ===
In the 2010s, after having focused on cosmology and quantum information for around 25 years, Tegmark's research started to focus on machine learning and AI safety. He has worked at MIT on how to use AI in physics and how to improve AI using insights from physics. In 2024, he co-authored a paper introducing Kolmogorov-Arnold Networks (KANs), which differ fundamentally from the neural networks typically used in machine learning and are designed to be more interpretable. KANs are based on the Kolmogorov–Arnold representation theorem, which was previously thought to be irrelevant to machine learning.

== Future of Life Institute ==
Under Tegmark's founding leadership, the Future of Life Institute has pursued a stated mission to "steer transformative technologies away from extreme, large-scale risks and towards benefiting life". It is focused on research aiming to mitigate large-scale risks for humanity, particularly those related to advanced AI. A co-founding faculty member was University of California, Santa Cruz professor Anthony Aguirre, now Executive Director of the organization. Its board-level leadership has included Elon Musk, Skype and Kazaa founder Jaan Tallinn, as well as actors (Alan Alda and Morgan Freeman), and individual graduate students (including his wife, Meia Chita-Tegmark, then a Boston University PhD student). Tegmark and the organization are academic proponents of approaches and views that are aware of and wrestle with the potential risks associated with the development of AI. It received a cryptocurrency donation of $665 million donation from Vitalik Buterin in 2021, as well as a $10 million donation from Elon Musk in 2015 and additional funding by board member and Skype co-founder Jaan Tallinn.

In 2023, Tegmark was the focus of a controversy when he was alleged to have signed a letter of intent on behalf of the Future of Life Institute for a $100,000 grant—ultimately rejected—to far-right media outlet Nya Dagbladet, an outlet for which Tegmark's brother wrote, an allegation to which the Institute formally responded. Tegmark later said that the Institute "ultimately decided to reject it because of what our subsequent due diligence uncovered", that they rejected it long before the media became involved, and that the institute "finds Nazi, neo-Nazi or pro-Nazi groups or ideologies despicable and would never knowingly support them". An official statement from the Future of Life Institute further expands on this: "FLI finds groups or ideologies espousing antisemitism, white supremacy, or racism despicable and would never knowingly support any such group".

== Awards and recognition ==
Tegmark was elected Fellow of the American Physical Society in 2012 for, according to the citation, "his contributions to cosmology, including precision measurements from cosmic microwave background and galaxy clustering data, tests of inflation and gravitation theories, and the development of a new technology for low-frequency radio interferometry".

He was awarded the Royal Swedish Academy of Engineering Science's Gold Medal in 2019 for, according to the citation, "his contributions to our understanding of humanity's place in the cosmos and the opportunities and risks associated with artificial intelligence. He has courageously tackled these existential questions in his research and, in a commendable way, succeeded in communicating the issues to a wider public."

In 2023, Time named Tegmark one of the 100 most influential people in AI.

== Publications ==
=== Books ===
- Tegmark, Max (2014). Our Mathematical Universe: My Quest for the Ultimate Nature of Reality. Knopf.
- Tegmark, Max (2017). Life 3.0: Being Human in the Age of Artificial Intelligence. Knopf.

=== Selected articles ===
- Eisenstein, Daniel J.; Hu, Wayne; Tegmark, Max (1998). "Cosmic Complementarity: $H_0$ and $\Omega_m$ from Combining Cosmic Microwave Background Experiments and Redshift Surveys". The Astrophysical Journal. 504 (2): L57–L60. arXiv:astro-ph/9805239. Bibcode:1998ApJ...504L..57E. doi:10.1086/311582. S2CID 8824919.
- Tegmark, Max (1 April 2000). "The Importance of Quantum Decoherence in Brain Processes". Physical Review E. 61 (4): 4194–4206. arXiv:quant-ph/9907009. Bibcode:2000PhRvE..61.4194T. doi:10.1103/PhysRevE.61.4194. PMID 11088215. S2CID 17140058.
- Tegmark, Max; de Oliveira-Costa, Angélica; Hamilton, Andrew (1 December 2003). "High Resolution Foreground Cleaned CMB Map from WMAP". Physical Review D. 68 (12) 123523. arXiv:astro-ph/0302496. Bibcode:2003PhRvD..68l3523T. doi:10.1103/PhysRevD.68.123523. S2CID 17981329.
- Tegmark, Max; et al. (2004). "Cosmological parameters from SDSS and WMAP". Physical Review D. 69 (10) 103501. arXiv:astro-ph/0310723. Bibcode:2004PhRvD..69j3501T. doi:10.1103/PhysRevD.69.103501.
- Tegmark, Max; et al. (2004). "The three-dimensional power spectrum of galaxies from the sloan digital sky survey". The Astrophysical Journal. 606 (2): 702–740. arXiv:astro-ph/0310725. Bibcode:2004ApJ...606..702T. doi:10.1086/382125.
- Tegmark, Max (2008). "The Mathematical Universe". Foundations of Physics. 38 (2): 101–150. arXiv:0704.0646. Bibcode:2008FoPh...38..101T. doi:10.1007/s10701-007-9186-9. S2CID 9890455.
- Aguirre, Anthony; Tegmark, Max (3 November 2011). "Born in an Infinite Universe: A Cosmological Interpretation of Quantum Mechanics". Physical Review D. 84 (10) 105002. arXiv:1008.1066. Bibcode:2011PhRvD..84j5002A. doi:10.1103/physrevd.84.105002. ISSN 1550-7998. S2CID 17341893.

== Select media activities ==
- In 2006, Tegmark was one of fifty scientists interviewed by New Scientist about their predictions for the future. His prediction: "In 50 years, you may be able to buy T-shirts on which are printed equations describing the unified laws of our universes."
- Tegmark appears in the 2007 documentary Parallel Worlds, Parallel Lives in which he is interviewed by Mark Oliver Everett, son of the founder of the many-worlds interpretation of quantum mechanics, Hugh Everett.
- Tegmark also appears in "Who's Afraid of a Big Black Hole?", "What Time is It?", "To Infinity and Beyond", "Is Everything We Know About The Universe Wrong?", "What is Reality?" and "Which Universe Are We In?", all part of the BBC's Horizon scientific series of programmes.
- He appears in several episodes of Sci Fi Science: Physics of the Impossible, an American documentary television series on science which first aired in the United States on December 1, 2009. The series is hosted by theoretical physicist Michio Kaku.
- Tegmark was interviewed by Morgan Freeman in seasons 2 and 3 of Through the Wormhole in 2011–2012.
- Tegmark participated in the episode "Zooming Out" of BBC World Service's The Forum, which first aired on BBC Radio 4 on 26 April 2014.
- In 2014, Tegmark co-authored an op-ed in The Huffington Post with Stephen Hawking, Frank Wilczek and Stuart Russell on the movie Transcendence.
- In 2014, "The Perpetual Earth Program," a play based on Tegmark's book Our Mathematical Universe, was mounted in New York City as part of the Planet Connections Theatre Festival.
- In 2014, he featured in The Principle, a documentary examining the Copernican Principle.
- In 2015, Tegmark participated in an episode of Sam Harris' the Waking Up podcast entitled "The Multiverse & You (& You & You & You...)" where they discussed topics such as artificial intelligence and the mathematical universe hypothesis.
- In 2017, Tegmark gave a talk entitled "Effective altruism, existential risk & existential hope" at the world's largest annual conference of the effective altruism movement.
- In 2017, Tegmark participated in an episode of Sam Harris' the Waking Up podcast entitled "The Future of Intelligence" where they discussed topics such as artificial intelligence and definitions of life.
- In 2018, Tegmark took part in a conversation with podcaster Lex Fridman about Artificial General Intelligence as part of a MIT course on AGI. He was the first guest on the Lex Fridman podcast. He was interviewed again on the Lex Fridman podcast in 2021 and in 2023.
- Tegmark is interviewed in the 2018 documentary on artificial intelligence, Do You Trust This Computer?.
- In 2024, Tegmark was featured in Business Insider in an article called "Trump sees China as the biggest AI threat. He has bipartisan support to win the race for powerful human-like AI", which discussed the geopolitical race toward artificial general intelligence.
- In 2025, Tegmark was featured in the Financial Times in an article entitled "Big Tech pushes for 10-year ban on US states regulating AI", which examined efforts by technology companies to limit state-level AI regulation.
- In 2025, Tegmark was interviewed by CNN in a segment called "This expert predicts superintelligence could make 'everybody economically obsolete'", where he discussed the economic implications of advanced AI systems.
- In 2025, Tegmark was featured in a Forbes article titled "Calculating The Risk Of ASI Starts With Human Minds", which discussed frameworks for assessing the risks of artificial superintelligence.
- In 2025, Tegmark appeared on MSNBC in a segment alongside actor Joseph Gordon-Levitt discussing the threat of AI superintelligence.
- In 2025, Tegmark participated in a conversation with Yuval Noah Harari on Bloomberg Live, which was titled "Harari and Tegmark on Humanity and AI". In the conversation, they discussed the future of human civilization in the age of artificial intelligence.
- In 2026, Tegmark was featured in TIME magazine's cover story entitled "The People Vs. AI", which examined growing public resistance to unchecked AI development.
- In 2026, Tegmark was featured in Bloomberg in "Prince Harry, Geoffrey Hinton Call for Ban on AI Superintelligence", which covered a landmark petition signed by prominent public figures calling for a halt to superintelligence development.

== Personal life ==
Tegmark married astrophysicist Angelica de Oliveira-Costa in 1997, and divorced in 2009. They have two sons. On August 5, 2012, Tegmark married Meia Chita, with whom he has one son.

== See also ==
- List of astronomers
- List of physicists
