= Kate Larson (computer scientist) =

Canadian computer scientist

Academic background
- Education: Memorial University of Newfoundland (BS); Washington University in St. Louis (MS); Carnegie Mellon University (PhD)

Academic work
- Discipline: Computer science
- Sub-discipline: Algorithmic mechanism design Multi-agent systems Cooperative game theory
- Institutions: University of Waterloo

Kate S. Larson is a Canadian computer scientist working as a professor, Pasupalak AI Fellow, and University Research Chair in the Cheriton School of Computer Science of the University of Waterloo.

== Education ==
Larson majored in mathematics at the Memorial University of Newfoundland, where she graduated with a Bachelor of Science degree in mathematics 1997. After earning a master's degree in computer science at Washington University in St. Louis in 1999, she completed a Ph.D. in computer science in 2004 at Carnegie Mellon University. Her dissertation, Mechanism Design for Computationally Limited Agents, was supervised by Tuomas Sandholm.

== Career ==
Larson returned to Canada as an assistant professor of computer science at the University of Waterloo in 2004. There, she was promoted to associate professor in 2009 and full professor in 2017, named as Pasupalak AI Fellow in 2018, and given a University Research Chair in 2019. Larson's research concerns algorithmic mechanism design, cooperative game theory, and the formation of coalitions in multi-agent systems.

== Recognition ==
In 2015 the Canadian Association of Computer Science named her as an outstanding young researcher. She was elected an AAAI Fellow in 2025.
