= Superintelligence =

Hypothetical agent surpassing human intelligence

A superintelligence is a hypothetical agent that possesses intelligence far surpassing that of the most gifted human minds. Philosopher Nick Bostrom defined it in his 2014 book Superintelligence as "any intellect that greatly exceeds the cognitive performance of humans in virtually all domains of interest". The term is now almost always used to discuss artificial superintelligence (ASI) through continued rapid progress in artificial intelligence, although its arrival through biological superintelligence (BSI) has been a source of interest among scientists, futurists, and authors.

Recursive self-improvement, a scenario in which an AI system iteratively improves its own intelligence, is theorized to potentially lead to an intelligence explosion and the creation of an artificial superintelligence.

Most AI experts believe that the creation of artificial superintelligence will pose substantial existential risk. A minority believe that the arrival of superintelligence is too far away to be the focus of attention, or that it does not pose a significant threat compared to other existential risks. There have been proposals to implement an international treaty to prevent its emergence. In October 2025, hundreds of public figures, including AI experts, Nobel Prize laureates, and national security officials signed a statement calling for a ban on superintelligence's development. Concern over ASI greatly increased in 2026. Polls have found that large majorities in America and Britain oppose ASI development.

== Forms ==
=== Artificial superintelligence ===
Philosopher David Chalmers argues that artificial general intelligence is a very likely path to artificial superintelligence (ASI). Chalmers breaks this claim down into an argument that AI can achieve equivalence to human intelligence, that it can be extended to surpass human intelligence, and that it can be further amplified to completely dominate humans across arbitrary tasks.

Concerning human-level equivalence, Chalmers argues that the human brain is a mechanical system, and therefore ought to be emulatable by synthetic materials. He also notes that human intelligence was able to biologically evolve, making it more likely that human engineers will be able to recapitulate this invention. Evolutionary algorithms, in particular, should be able to produce human-level AI. Concerning intelligence extension and amplification, Chalmers argues that new AI technologies can generally be improved on, and that this is particularly likely when the invention can assist in designing new technologies.

An AI system capable of self-improvement could enhance its own intelligence, thereby becoming more efficient at improving itself. This cycle of "recursive self-improvement" might cause an intelligence explosion, resulting in the creation of a superintelligence.

Computer components already greatly surpass human performance in speed. Bostrom writes, "Biological neurons operate at a peak speed of about 200 Hz, a full seven orders of magnitude slower than a modern microprocessor (~2 GHz)." Moreover, neurons transmit spike signals across axons at no greater than 120 m/s, "whereas existing electronic processing cores can communicate optically at the speed of light". Thus, the simplest example of a superintelligence may be an emulated human mind running on much faster hardware than the brain. A human-like reasoner who could think millions of times faster than current humans would have a dominant advantage in most reasoning tasks, particularly ones that require haste or long strings of actions.

Another advantage of computers is modularity, that is, their size or computational capacity can be increased. A non-human (or modified human) brain could become much larger than a present-day human brain, like many supercomputers. Bostrom also raises the possibility of collective superintelligence: a large enough number of separate reasoning systems, if they communicated and coordinated well enough, could act in aggregate with far greater capabilities than any sub-agent.

Humans outperform non-human animals in large part because of new or enhanced reasoning capacities, such as long-term planning and language use. (See evolution of human intelligence and primate cognition.) If there are other possible improvements to reasoning that would have a similarly large impact, this makes it more likely that an agent can be built that outperforms humans in the same fashion humans outperform chimpanzees.

The above advantages hold for artificial superintelligence, but it is not clear how many hold for biological superintelligence. Physiological constraints limit the speed and size of biological brains in many ways that are inapplicable to machine intelligence. As such, writers on superintelligence have devoted much more attention to superintelligent AI scenarios.

=== Biological superintelligence ===
Carl Sagan suggested that the advent of Caesarean sections and in vitro fertilization may permit humans to evolve larger heads, resulting in improvements via natural selection in the heritable component of human intelligence. By contrast, Gerald Crabtree has argued that decreased selection pressure is resulting in a slow, centuries-long reduction in human intelligence and that this process instead is likely to continue. There is no scientific consensus concerning either possibility and in both cases, the biological change would be slow, especially relative to rates of cultural change.

Selective breeding, nootropics, epigenetic modulation, and genetic engineering could improve human intelligence more rapidly. Bostrom writes that if we come to understand the genetic component of intelligence, pre-implantation genetic diagnosis could be used to select for embryos with as much as 4 points of IQ gain (if one embryo is selected out of two), or with larger gains (e.g., up to 24.3 IQ points gained if one embryo is selected out of 1000). If this process is iterated over many generations, the gains could be an order of magnitude improvement. Bostrom suggests that deriving new gametes from embryonic stem cells could be used to iterate the selection process rapidly. A well-organized society of high-intelligence humans of this sort could potentially achieve collective superintelligence.

Alternatively, collective intelligence might be constructed by better organizing humans at present levels of individual intelligence. Several writers have suggested that human civilization, or some aspect of it (e.g., the Internet, or the economy), is coming to function like a global brain with capacities far exceeding its component agents. A prediction market is sometimes considered as an example of a working collective intelligence system, consisting of humans only (assuming algorithms are not used to inform decisions).

A final method of intelligence amplification would be to directly enhance individual humans, as opposed to enhancing their social or reproductive dynamics. This could be achieved using nootropics, somatic gene therapy, or brain−computer interfaces. However, Bostrom expresses skepticism about the scalability of the first two approaches and argues that designing a superintelligent cyborg interface is an AI-complete problem.

Several scientists and forecasters have been arguing for prioritizing early research into the possible benefits and risks of human and machine cognitive enhancement, because of the potential social impact of such technologies.

== Superintelligence companies ==
In 2024, Ilya Sutskever left OpenAI to cofound the startup Safe Superintelligence, which focuses solely on creating a superintelligence that is safe by design, while avoiding "distraction by management overhead or product cycles". Despite still offering no product, the startup became valued at $30 billion in February 2025.

In 2025, Meta created Meta Superintelligence Labs, a new AI division led by Alexandr Wang.

== Forecasts ==
Most surveyed AI researchers expect machines to eventually be able to rival humans in intelligence, though there is little consensus on when this will likely happen.

In a 2022 survey, the median year by which respondents expected "High-level machine intelligence" with 50% confidence is 2061. The survey defined the achievement of high-level machine intelligence as when unaided machines can accomplish every task better and more cheaply than human workers.

In 2023, OpenAI leaders Sam Altman, Greg Brockman and Ilya Sutskever published recommendations for the governance of superintelligence, which they believe may happen in less than 10 years.

In 2025, the forecast scenario AI 2027 led by Daniel Kokotajlo predicted rapid progress in the automation of coding and AI research, followed by ASI. In September 2025, a review of surveys of scientists and industry experts from the last 15 years reported that most agreed that artificial general intelligence (AGI), a level well below technological singularity, will occur before the year 2100. A more recent analysis by AIMultiple reported that, “Current surveys of AI researchers are predicting AGI around 2040”.

== Design considerations ==
Exploring the potential motivations of an artificial superintelligence, Bostrom distinguishes final goals and instrumental goals. From the point of view of an agent, final goals are intrinsically valuable, whereas instrumental goals are only useful for attaining final goals. He proposed the "orthogonality thesis", which postulates that in principle, virtually any final goal can be combined with virtually any level of intelligence. Bostrom also introduced the concept of instrumental convergence, which postulates that certain instrumental goals (such as self-preservation, resource acquisition or cognitive enhancement) increase the probability of achieving final goals in a wide range of situations, and would thus likely be pursued by a broad spectrum of intelligent agents.

William MacAskill argued that aligning advanced AI with current human values could be catastrophic if those values are permanently locked in and humanity still has moral blind spots like slavery in the past.

One proposed approach focuses on system architecture, using a collective intelligence of human and AI agents to support transparency, scalable safety mechanisms, human oversight, and continued alignment as capabilities increase.

Several proposals for an ASI's final goals have been put forward:

- Coherent extrapolated volition (CEV) – The AI should have the values upon which humans would converge if they were more knowledgeable and rational.
- Moral rightness (MR) – The AI should be programmed to do what is morally right, relying on its superior cognitive abilities to determine ethical actions.
- Moral permissibility (MP) – The AI should stay within the bounds of moral permissibility while otherwise pursuing goals aligned with human values (similar to CEV).

Bostrom elaborates on these concepts:

instead of implementing humanity's coherent extrapolated volition, one could try to build an AI to do what is morally right, relying on the AI's superior cognitive capacities to figure out just which actions fit that description. We can call this proposal "moral rightness" (MR) ...

MR would also appear to have some disadvantages. It relies on the notion of "morally right", a notoriously difficult concept, one with which philosophers have grappled since antiquity without yet attaining consensus as to its analysis. Picking an erroneous explication of "moral rightness" could result in outcomes that would be morally very wrong ...

One might try to preserve the basic idea of the MR model while reducing its demandingness by focusing on moral permissibility: the idea being that we could let the AI pursue humanity's CEV so long as it did not act in morally impermissible ways.

== Opposition to its development ==
Due to the potential risks, there have been proposals to implement an international treaty to prevent its emergence. In October 2025, hundreds of public figures, including AI experts, Nobel Prize laureates, and national security officials signed a statement calling for a ban on superintelligence's development. Concern over ASI greatly increased in 2026.

=== Public ===
Polls have found that large majorities in the United States and the United Kingdom oppose ASI development.

=== Legislation ===
In 2026, US senator Bernie Sanders and Congressman Greg Casar proposed the 19-page Ban Artificial Superintelligence Act, a bill that would halt prospective development of advanced AI and creation of superintelligence uncontrollable by humans until some Department of Artificial Intelligence, meant to provide strict oversight and testing of such research, was created at the Cabinet level. Several precusors were defined for superintelligence development, including recursive self-improvement.

== See also ==
- AI takeover
- Artificial brain
- Artificial intelligence arms race
- Effective altruism
- Ethics of artificial intelligence
- Existential risk
- Friendly artificial intelligence
- Future of Humanity Institute
- Intelligent agent
- Machine ethics
- Machine Intelligence Research Institute
- Machine learning
- Neural scaling law – Statistical law in machine learning
- Noosphere – Philosophical concept of biosphere successor via humankind's rational activities
- Outline of artificial intelligence
- Posthumanism
- Robotics
- Self-replication
- Self-replicating machine
- Superhuman
- Superintelligence: Paths, Dangers, Strategies
