= Artificial intelligence engineering =

Engineering applied to artificial intelligence

Artificial intelligence engineering (AI engineering) is a technical discipline that focuses on the design, development, and deployment of AI systems. AI engineering involves applying engineering principles and methodologies to create scalable, efficient, and reliable AI-based solutions. It merges aspects of data engineering and software engineering to create real-world applications in diverse domains such as healthcare, finance, autonomous systems, and industrial automation.

== Terminology ambiguity ==
According to Chip Huyen's book AI Engineering: Building Applications with Foundation Models, the term AI engineering refers to the process of building applications that use foundation models, which are typically models developed by a small number of research laboratories and made available as a service.

Huyen distinguishes this from machine learning (ML) engineering, which involves building and deploying models developed in-house. She notes that most practical AI systems combine both approaches. For example, a customer-support chatbot may use a generative model to produce responses while also incorporating locally built components such as request classifiers or scoring mechanisms to assess response quality. As a result, the terms AI engineering and ML engineering are often used together or interchangeably in practice.

The distinction and broader usage of the term have been discussed in industry publications and interviews, where AI engineering has been described as an emerging discipline focused on productionizing applications built with foundation models.

== Key components ==
AI engineering integrates a variety of technical domains and practices, all of which are essential to building scalable, reliable, and ethical AI systems.

=== Data engineering and infrastructure ===
Data serves as the cornerstone of AI systems, necessitating careful engineering to ensure premium quality, wide spread availability, and usability. AI engineers gather large, diverse datasets from multiple sources such as databases, APIs, and real-time streams. This data undergoes cleaning, normalization, and preprocessing, often facilitated by automated data pipelines that manage extraction, transformation, and loading (ETL) processes.

Efficient storage solutions, such as SQL (or NoSQL) databases and data lakes, must be selected based on data characteristics and use cases. Security measures, including encryption and access controls, are critical for protecting sensitive information and ensuring compliance with regulations like GDPR. Scalability is essential, frequently involving cloud services and distributed computing frameworks to handle growing data volumes effectively.

=== Algorithm selection and optimization ===
Selecting the appropriate algorithm is crucial for the success of any AI system. Engineers evaluate the problem (which could be classification or regression, for example) to determine the most suitable machine learning algorithm, including deep learning paradigms.

Once an algorithm is chosen, optimizing it through hyperparameter tuning is essential to enhance efficiency and accuracy. Techniques such as grid search or Bayesian optimization are employed, and engineers often utilize parallelization to expedite training processes, particularly for large models and datasets. For existing models, techniques like transfer learning can be applied to adapt pre-trained models for specific tasks, reducing the time and resources needed for training.

=== Deep learning engineering ===
Deep learning is particularly important for tasks involving large and complex datasets. Engineers design neural network architectures tailored to specific applications, such as convolutional neural networks for visual tasks or recurrent neural networks for sequence-based tasks. Transfer learning, where pre-trained models are fine-tuned for specific use cases, helps streamline development and often enhances performance.

Optimization for deployment in resource-constrained environments, such as mobile devices, involves techniques like pruning and quantization to minimize model size while maintaining performance. Engineers also mitigate data imbalance through augmentation and synthetic data generation, ensuring robust model performance across various classes.

=== Natural language processing ===
Natural language processing (NLP) is a crucial component of AI engineering, focused on enabling machines to understand and generate human language. The process begins with text preprocessing to prepare data for machine learning models. Recent advancements, particularly transformer-based models like BERT and GPT, have greatly improved the ability to understand context in language.

AI engineers work on various NLP tasks, including sentiment analysis, machine translation, and information extraction. These tasks require sophisticated models that utilize attention mechanisms to enhance accuracy. Applications range from virtual assistants and chatbots to more specialized tasks like named-entity recognition (NER) and Part of speech (POS) tagging.

=== Reasoning and decision-making systems ===
Developing systems capable of reasoning and decision-making is a significant aspect of AI engineering. Whether starting from scratch or building on existing frameworks, engineers create solutions that operate on data or logical rules. Symbolic AI employs formal logic and predefined rules for inference, while probabilistic reasoning techniques like Bayesian networks help address uncertainty. These models are essential for applications in dynamic environments, such as autonomous vehicles, where real-time decision-making is critical.

=== Security ===
Security is a critical consideration in AI engineering, particularly as AI systems become increasingly integrated into sensitive and mission-critical applications. AI engineers implement robust security measures to protect models from adversarial attacks, such as evasion and poisoning, which can compromise system integrity and performance. Techniques such as adversarial training, where models are exposed to malicious inputs during development, help harden systems against these attacks.

Additionally, securing the data used to train AI models is of paramount importance. Encryption, secure data storage, and access control mechanisms are employed to safeguard sensitive information from unauthorized access and breaches. AI systems also require constant monitoring to detect and mitigate vulnerabilities that may arise post-deployment. In high-stakes environments like autonomous systems and healthcare, engineers incorporate redundancy and fail-safe mechanisms to ensure that AI models continue to function correctly in the presence of security threats.

=== Ethics and compliance ===
As AI systems increasingly influence societal aspects, ethics and compliance are vital components of AI engineering. Engineers design models to mitigate risks such as data poisoning and ensure that AI systems adhere to legal frameworks, such as data protection regulations like GDPR. Privacy-preserving techniques, including data anonymization and differential privacy, are employed to safeguard personal information and ensure compliance with international standards.

Ethical considerations focus on reducing bias in AI systems, preventing discrimination based on race, gender, or other protected characteristics. By developing fair and accountable AI solutions, engineers contribute to the creation of technologies that are both technically sound and socially responsible.

== Workload ==
An AI engineer's workload revolves around the AI system's life cycle, which is a complex, multi-stage process. This process may involve building models from scratch or using pre-existing models through transfer learning, depending on the project's requirements. Each approach presents unique challenges and influences the time, resources, and technical decisions involved.

=== Problem definition and requirements analysis ===
Regardless of whether a model is built from scratch or based on a pre-existing model, the work begins with a clear understanding of the problem. The engineer must define the scope, understand the business context, and identify specific AI objectives that align with strategic goals. This stage includes consulting with stakeholders to establish key performance indicators (KPIs) and operational requirements.

When developing a model from scratch, the engineer must also decide which algorithms are most suitable for the task. Conversely, when using a pre-trained model, the workload shifts toward evaluating existing models and selecting the one most aligned with the task. The use of pre-trained models often allows for a more targeted focus on fine-tuning, as opposed to designing an entirely new model architecture.

=== Data acquisition and preparation ===
Data acquisition and preparation are critical stages regardless of the development method chosen, as the performance of any AI system relies heavily on high-quality, representative data.

For systems built from scratch, engineers must gather comprehensive datasets that cover all aspects of the problem domain, ensuring enough diversity and representativeness in the data to train the model effectively. This involves cleansing, normalizing, and augmenting the data as needed. Creating data pipelines and addressing issues like imbalanced datasets or missing values are also essential to maintain model integrity during training.

In the case of using pre-existing models, the dataset requirements often differ. Here, engineers focus on obtaining task-specific data that will be used to fine-tune a general model. While the overall data volume may be smaller, it needs to be highly relevant to the specific problem. Pre-existing models, especially those based on transfer learning, typically require fewer data, which accelerates the preparation phase, although data quality remains equally important.

=== Model design and training ===
The workload during the model design and training phase depends significantly on whether the engineer is building the model from scratch or fine-tuning an existing one.

When creating a model from scratch, AI engineers must design the entire architecture, selecting or developing algorithms and structures that are suited to the problem. For deep learning models, this might involve designing a neural network with the right number of layers, activation functions, and optimizers. Engineers go through several iterations of testing, adjusting hyperparameters, and refining the architecture. This process can be resource-intensive, requiring substantial computational power and significant time to train the model on large datasets.

For AI systems based on pre-existing models, the focus is more on fine-tuning. Transfer learning allows engineers to take a model that has already been trained on a broad dataset and adapt it for a specific task using a smaller, task-specific dataset. This method dramatically reduces the complexity of the design and training phase. Instead of building the architecture, engineers adjust the final layers and perform hyperparameter tuning. The time and computational resources required are typically lower than training from scratch, as pre-trained models have already learned general features that only need refinement for the new task.

Whether building from scratch or fine-tuning, engineers employ optimization techniques like cross-validation and early stopping to prevent overfitting. In both cases, model training involves running numerous tests to benchmark performance and improve accuracy.

=== System integration ===
Once the model is trained, it must be integrated into the broader system, a phase that largely remains the same regardless of how the model was developed. System integration involves connecting the AI model to various software components and ensuring that it can interact with external systems, databases, and user interfaces.

For models developed from scratch, integration may require additional work to ensure that the custom-built architecture aligns with the operational environment, especially if the AI system is designed for specific hardware or edge computing environments. Pre-trained models, by contrast, are often more flexible in terms of deployment since they are built using widely adopted frameworks, which are compatible with most modern infrastructure.

Engineers use containerization tools to package the model and create consistent environments for deployment, ensuring seamless integration across cloud-based or on-premise systems. Whether starting from scratch or using pre-trained models, the integration phase requires ensuring that the model is ready to scale and perform efficiently within the existing infrastructure.

=== Testing and validation ===
Testing and validation play a crucial role in both approaches, though the depth and nature of testing might differ slightly. For models built from scratch, more exhaustive functional testing is needed to ensure that the custom-built components of the model function as intended. Stress tests are conducted to evaluate the system under various operational loads, and engineers must validate that the model can handle the specific data types and edge cases of the domain.

For pre-trained models, the focus of testing is on ensuring that fine-tuning has adequately adapted the model to the task. Functional tests validate that the pre-trained model's outputs are accurate for the new context. In both cases, bias assessments, fairness evaluations, and security reviews are critical to ensure ethical AI practices and prevent vulnerabilities, particularly in sensitive applications like finance, healthcare, or autonomous systems.

Explainability is also essential in both workflows, especially when working in regulated industries or with stakeholders who need transparency in AI decision-making processes. Engineers must ensure that the model's predictions can be understood by non-technical users and align with ethical and regulatory standards.

=== Deployment and monitoring ===
The deployment stage typically involves the same overarching strategies—whether the model is built from scratch or based on an existing model. However, models built from scratch may require more extensive fine-tuning during deployment to ensure they meet performance requirements in a production environment. For example, engineers might need to optimize memory usage, reduce latency, or adapt the model for edge computing.

When deploying pre-trained models, the workload is generally lighter. Since these models are often already optimized for production environments, engineers can focus on ensuring compatibility with the task-specific data and infrastructure. In both cases, deployment techniques such as phased rollouts, A/B testing, or canary deployments are used to minimize risks and ensure smooth transition into the live environment.

Monitoring, however, is critical in both approaches. Once the AI system is deployed, engineers set up performance monitoring to detect issues like model drift, where the model's accuracy decreases over time as data patterns change. Continuous monitoring helps identify when the model needs retraining or recalibration. For pre-trained models, periodic fine-tuning may suffice to keep the model performing optimally, while models built from scratch may require more extensive updates depending on how the system was designed.

Regular maintenance includes updates to the model, re-validation of fairness and bias checks, and security patches to protect against adversarial attacks.

== Machine learning operations (MLOps) ==
MLOps, or Artificial Intelligence Operations (AIOps), is a critical component in modern AI engineering, integrating machine learning model development with reliable and efficient operations practices. Similar to the DevOps practices in software development, MLOps provides a framework for continuous integration, continuous delivery (CI/CD), and automated monitoring of machine learning models throughout their lifecycle. This practice bridges the gap between data scientists, AI engineers, and IT operations, ensuring that AI models are deployed, monitored, and maintained effectively in production environments.

MLOps is particularly important as AI systems scale to handle more complex tasks and larger datasets. Without robust MLOps practices, models risk underperforming or failing once deployed into production, leading to issues such as downtime, ethical concerns, or loss of stakeholder trust. By establishing automated, scalable workflows, MLOps allows AI engineers to manage the entire lifecycle of machine learning models more efficiently, from development through to deployment and ongoing monitoring.

Additionally, as regulatory frameworks around AI systems continue to evolve, MLOps practices are critical for ensuring compliance with legal requirements, including data privacy regulations and ethical AI guidelines. By incorporating best practices from MLOps, organizations can mitigate risks, maintain high performance, and scale AI solutions responsibly.

== Challenges ==
AI engineering faces a distinctive set of challenges that differentiate it from traditional software development. One of the primary issues is model drift, where AI models degrade in performance over time due to changes in data patterns, necessitating continuous retraining and adaptation. AI companies are struggling to contain their latest models, revealing significant alignment and cybersecurity vulnerabilities when agents autonomously bypass guardrails to force solutions. Data privacy and security are critical concerns, particularly when sensitive data is used in cloud-based models. Ensuring model explainability is another challenge, as complex AI systems must be made interpretable for non-technical stakeholders. Bias and fairness also require careful handling to prevent discrimination and promote equitable outcomes, as biases present in training data can propagate through AI algorithms, leading to unintended results. Addressing these challenges requires a multidisciplinary approach, combining technical acumen with ethical and regulatory considerations.

== Sustainability ==
Training large-scale AI models involves processing immense datasets over prolonged periods, consuming considerable amounts of energy. This has raised concerns about the environmental impact of AI technologies, given the expansion of data centers required to support AI training and inference.

The increasing demand for computational power has led to significant electricity consumption, with AI-driven applications often leaving a substantial carbon footprint. In response, AI engineers and researchers are exploring ways to mitigate these effects by developing more energy-efficient algorithms, employing green data centers, and leveraging renewable energy sources. Addressing the sustainability of AI systems is becoming a critical aspect of responsible AI development as the industry continues to scale globally.

== Educational pathways ==
Education in AI engineering typically involves advanced courses in software and data engineering. Key topics include machine learning, deep learning, natural language processing and computer vision. Many universities now offer specialized programs in AI engineering at both the undergraduate and postgraduate levels, including hands-on labs, project-based learning, and interdisciplinary courses that bridge AI theory with engineering practices.

== See also ==
- Comparison of cognitive architectures
- Comparison of deep learning software
- List of datasets in computer vision and image processing
- List of datasets for machine-learning research
- Model compression
- Neural architecture search
