= Neural Network Intelligence =

Microsoft open source library

NNI (Neural Network Intelligence)
- Original author: Microsoft Research
- Developer: Microsoft
- Release: 2018; 8 years ago
- Stable release: v3.0 / September 15, 2023; 3 years ago
- Written in: Python
- Operating system: Windows, macOS, Ubuntu
- Platform: Cross-platform
- Type: AutoML toolkit
- License: MIT License
- Website: nni.readthedocs.io
- Repository: github.com/microsoft/nni

NNI (Neural Network Intelligence) is a free and open-source AutoML toolkit developed by Microsoft. It is used to automate feature engineering, model compression, neural architecture search, and hyper-parameter tuning.

The source code is licensed under MIT License and available on GitHub.

== See also ==
- Machine learning
- ML.NET
