= Deeploy =

Dutch software company

- Type: Private
- Industry: Artificial intelligence software
- Founded: 2020; 6 years ago
- Founders: Maarten Stolk; Tim Kleinloog; Bastiaan van de Rakt; Nick Jetten
- Headquarters: Utrecht, Netherlands
- Products: AI governance platform
- Website: deeploy.ai

Deeploy is a Dutch software company based in Utrecht, the Netherlands. It develops a machine-learning operations (MLOps) platform for AI governance, which makes AI model decisions explainable. The software helps organisations document and monitor AI models to support compliance with regulations like the EU AI Act.

== History ==
The company was founded in 2020 by Maarten Stolk, Tim Kleinloog, Bastiaan van de Rakt, and Nick Jetten as a spin-off of Enjins (a machine-learning engineering firm).

The first funding in January 2022 by venture capital fund Curiosity contributed €0.8 million to an overall €1 million round, to which the founders also contributed. In June 2023, Deeploy raised €2.5 million in a seed round led by the SI3 Fund.

In December 2023, the UK government’s Portfolio of AI Assurance Techniques, which contained a collection of case studies maintained by the Centre for Data Ethics and Innovation, included Deeploy. In February 2025, €2.5 million was received through a grant from the European Innovation Council Accelerator under the programme "Human-Centric Generative AI Made in Europe", with an additional €5 million reserved as equity investment. The same year Deeploy was included in MT/Sprout's "Challenger50" list of Dutch start-ups and scale-ups, as well as announced as a partner for the data consultancy Digital Power to support organisations in implementing AI governance.

== Software ==
Deeploy's software deploys machine learning models and monitors their performance in production. It also generates documentation intended to support regulatory compliance and oversight. The software includes tools to explain AI model predictions, so that non-technical users can give feedback on them. It has been used in regulated sectors including healthcare, banking, insurance, and government.

== See also ==
- AI governance
- Explainable artificial intelligence
- Artificial Intelligence Act
- MLOps
