= Systems engineering (disambiguation) =

Systems engineering is a field focused on the design, integration, and management of complex systems over their life cycles. It is commonly applied in industries like aerospace, defense, and transportation. Systems engineering may also refer to:

- Digital systems engineering, a broad family of engineering disciplines focused on digital technologies such as:
  - Computer engineering
  - Software engineering
  - Data engineering
  - Artificial intelligence engineering
  - Cybersecurity engineering
- Computer engineering, a discipline that combines computer science and electronic engineering to design, develop, and manage computer hardware and software systems.
