= Automated machine learning =

Process of automating the application of machine learning

Automated machine learning (AutoML) is the process of automating the tasks of applying machine learning to real-world problems. It is the combination of automation and ML.

AutoML potentially includes every stage from beginning with a raw dataset to building a machine learning model ready for deployment. AutoML was proposed as an artificial intelligence-based solution to the growing challenge of applying machine learning. The high degree of automation in AutoML aims to allow non-experts to make use of machine learning models and techniques without requiring them to become experts in machine learning. Automating the process of applying machine learning end-to-end additionally offers the advantages of producing simpler solutions, faster creation of those solutions, and models that often outperform hand-designed models.

Common techniques used in AutoML include hyperparameter optimization, meta-learning and neural architecture search.

== Comparison to the standard approach ==
In a typical machine learning application, practitioners have a set of input data points to be used for training. The raw data may not be in a form that all algorithms can be applied to. To make the data amenable for machine learning, an expert may have to apply appropriate data pre-processing, feature engineering, feature extraction, and feature selection methods. After these steps, practitioners must then perform algorithm selection and hyperparameter optimization to maximize the predictive performance of their model. If deep learning is used, the architecture of the neural network must also be chosen manually by the machine learning expert.

Each of these steps may be challenging, resulting in significant hurdles to using machine learning. AutoML aims to simplify these steps for non-experts, and to make it easier for them to use machine learning techniques correctly and effectively.

AutoML plays an important role within the broader approach of automating data science, which also includes challenging tasks such as data engineering, data exploration and model interpretation and prediction.

== Targets of automation ==
Automated machine learning can target various stages of the machine learning process. Steps to automate are:

- Data preparation and ingestion (from raw data and miscellaneous formats)
  - Column type detection; e.g., Boolean, discrete numerical, continuous numerical, or text
  - Column intent detection; e.g., target/label, stratification field, numerical feature, categorical text feature, or free text feature
  - Task detection; e.g., binary classification, regression, clustering, or ranking
- Feature engineering
  - Feature selection
  - Feature extraction
  - Meta-learning and transfer learning
  - Detection and handling of skewed data and/or missing values
- Model selection - choosing which machine learning algorithm to use, often including multiple competing software implementations
- Ensembling - a form of consensus where using multiple models often gives better results than any single model
- Hyperparameter optimization of the learning algorithm and featurization
  - Neural architecture search
- Pipeline selection under time, memory, and complexity constraints
- Selection of evaluation metrics and validation procedures
- Problem checking
  - Leakage detection
  - Misconfiguration detection
- Analysis of obtained results
- Creating user interfaces and visualizations

== Challenges and limitations ==
There are a number of key challenges being tackled around automated machine learning. A big issue surrounding the field is referred to as "development as a cottage industry". This phrase refers to the issue in machine learning where development relies on manual decisions and biases of experts. This is contrasted to the goal of machine learning which is to create systems that can learn and improve from their own usage and analysis of the data. Basically, it's the struggle between how much experts should get involved in the learning of the systems versus how much freedom they should be giving the machines. However, experts and developers must help create and guide these machines to prepare them for their own learning. To create this system, it requires labor intensive work with knowledge of machine learning algorithms and system design.

Additionally, other challenges include meta-learning and computational resource allocation.

== See also ==
- Artificial intelligence
- Artificial intelligence and elections
- Neural architecture search
- Neuroevolution
- Self-tuning
- Neural Network Intelligence
- ModelOps
- Hyperparameter optimization
