= Scale co-occurrence matrix =

Scale co-occurrence matrix (SCM) is a method for image feature extraction within scale space after wavelet transformation, proposed by Wu Jun and Zhao Zhongming (Institute of Remote Sensing Application, China). In practice, we first do discrete wavelet transformation for one gray image and get sub images with different scales. Then we construct a series of scale based concurrent matrices, every matrix describing the gray level variation between two adjacent scales. Last we use selected functions (such as Harris statistical approach) to calculate measurements with SCM and do feature extraction and classification. One basis of the method is the fact: way texture information changes from one scale to another can represent that texture in some extent thus it can be used as a criterion for feature extraction. The matrix captures the relation of features between different scales rather than the features within a single scale space, which can represent the scale property of texture better. Also, there are several experiments showing that it can get more accurate results for texture classification than the traditional texture classification.

== Background ==
Texture can be regarded as a similarity grouping in an image. Traditional texture analysis can be divided into four major issues: feature extraction, texture discrimination, texture classification and shape from texture(to reconstruct 3D surface geometry from texture information). For tradition feature extraction, approaches are usually categorized into structural, statistical, model based and transform. Wavelet transformation is a popular method in numerical analysis and functional analysis, which captures both frequency and location information. Gray level co-occurrence matrix provides an important basis for SCM construction. SCM based on discrete wavelet frame transformation make use of both correlations and feature information so that it combines structural and statistical benefits.

=== Discrete wavelet frame (DWF) ===
In order to do SCM we have to use discrete wavelet frame (DWF) transformation first to get a series of sub images. The discrete wavelet frames is nearly identical to the standard wavelet transform, except that one upsamples the filters, rather than downsamples the image. Given an image, the DWF decomposes its channel using the same method as the wavelet transform, but without the subsampling process. This results in four filtered images with the same size as the input image. The decomposition is then continued in the LL channels only as in the wavelet transform, but since the image is not subsampled, the filter has to be upsampled by inserting zeros in between its coefficients. The number of channels, hence the number of features for DWF is given by 3 × l − 1. One dimension discrete wavelet frame decompose the image in this way:

$$d_i(k) = [ [g_i]^T x], \quad (i=1,\ldots,N)$$

== Example ==
If there are two sub images X_{1} and X_{0} from the parent image X (in practice X = X_{0}), X_{1} = [1 1;1 2], X_{2} = [1 1;1 4],the grayscale is 4 so that we can get k = 1, G = 4. X_{1}(1,1), (1,2) and (2,1) are 1, while X_{0}(1,1), (1,2) and (2,1) are 1, thus Φ_{1}(1,1) = 3; Similarly, Φ_{1}(2,4) = 1. The SCM is as following:

G=4	Gray level 0	Gray level 1	Gray level 2	Gray level 3	Gray level 4
Gray level 0	0	0	0	0	0
Gray level 1	3	0	0	0	0
Gray level 2	0	0	0	0	0
Gray level 3	0	0	0	0	0
Gray level 4	0	0	1	0	0
