= Adaptive ML =

French AI firm

- Type: Subsidiary
- Industry: Artificial intelligence, enterprise software
- Founded: 2023
- Founders: Julien Launay, Baptiste Pannier, Daniel Hesslow, Alessandro Cappelli, Axel Marmet, Olivier Cruchant
- Headquarters: New York, United States; Paris, France
- Key people: Julien Launay (CEO), Baptiste Pannier (CTO)
- Products: Adaptive Engine
- Services: Tools for deploying open-source LLMs
- Number of employees: 32 (2025)
- Parent: Datadog
- Website: www.adaptive-ml.com

Adaptive ML (often styled as Adaptive) is a software company based in New York, United States, and Paris, France. In June 2026 it was acquired by Datadog.

The company focuses on reinforcement learning (“RLOps”), providing tools that allow organizations to customize and operate open-source large language models for specific applications.

== History ==
Adaptive ML was founded in 2023 by Julien Launay, Baptiste Pannier, Daniel Hesslow, Alessandro Cappelli, Axel Marmet and Olivier Cruchant who had previously contributed to open-source language model projects such as Falcon and BLOOM, and held research and engineering roles at Hugging Face.

In March 2024, Adaptive ML raised a seed round of US $20 million led by Index Ventures, with participation from ICONIQ Capital, Motier Ventures, Databricks Ventures, and other investors. Sifted reported an implied valuation of $100m in this round.

Adaptive’s product team is based in Paris, France, while its corporate, financial, and sales and marketing functions are in New York.

In June 2026 Adaptive ML was acquired by Datadog, a NASDAQ-listed observability and security software company. The Adaptive ML team joined Datadog AI Research, the company's research lab.

== Technology and products ==
Adaptive ML develops a software platform called Adaptive Engine, used to fine-tune and operate open-source large language models.

The platform enables reinforcement-learning–based post-training and model-evaluation processes intended for data science teams. Reported areas of application include database query generation, automated customer-service workflows, and systems for retrieving internal information.

== Business model and vision ==
Adaptive ML operates on a B2B model: the platform is targeted at enterprises that wish to deploy large language models with a high degree of customization, privacy, and control, rather than using third-party public LLM APIs.

The company’s mission emphasizes long-term adaptability and continuous learning: as users interact with a model, their behavior and feedback become data for ongoing model tuning and improvement, allowing organizations to tailor AI systems to their specific domain, data, and user needs.

== See also ==
- Hugging Face
- Large language model
- Reinforcement learning
- Generative AI
