= Preferred Networks =

Japanese startup

Preferred Networks Inc.
- Native name: 株式会社Preferred Networks
- Company type: Private limited company
- Traded as: Unlisted
- Industry: Artificial intelligence
- Founded: March 26, 2014
- Headquarters: 1-6-1 Otemachi, Chiyoda City, Tokyo, Japan
- Key people: Toru Nishikawa (CEO); Daisuke Okanohara (COO)
- Products: AI research, development, and commercialization for physical-world problems
- Revenue: ¥8,486 million (As of January 31, 2021)
- Operating income: ▲¥1,013 million (As of January 31, 2021)
- Net income: ▲¥1,218 million (As of January 31, 2021)
- Total assets: ¥25,758 million (As of January 31, 2021)
- Total equity: ¥17,242 million (As of January 31, 2021)
- Website: www.preferred.jp

Preferred Infrastructure, Inc.
- Native name: 株式会社Preferred Infrastructure
- Company type: Private limited company
- Traded as: Unlisted
- Industry: Information technology
- Founded: March 2006
- Headquarters: 1-6-1 Otemachi, Chiyoda City, Tokyo, Japan
- Key people: Toru Nishikawa

Preferred Networks Inc. is a Japanese startup focused on the research and development of deep learning for IoT applications. The company was spun off from Preferred Infrastructure (PFI), founded by Toru Nishikawa, Daisuke Okanohara, and others on March 26, 2014.

== Overview ==
The company advocates for "Edge Heavy Computing," which involves the distributed, collaborative processing of massive data generated by devices at the edge of the network. It aims to achieve innovation in various fields, focusing on three major business areas: transportation systems, manufacturing, and bio-healthcare. Through the development of the open-source deep learning framework Chainer (development ceased in December 2019), it promotes advanced initiatives in collaboration with organizations such as Toyota Motor Corporation, FANUC, and National Cancer Center Japan.

== History ==
=== Preferred Infrastructure ===
- March 2006: During their studies at University of Tokyo, ACM International Collegiate Programming Contest Japan representatives Toru Nishikawa (CEO), Kazuki Ota (CTO, later founded Treasure Data in 2011), Daisuke Okanohara, and Jiro Nishitoba (founded Retrieva in 2016) along with other students established Preferred Infrastructure (PFI) with the aim of developing natural language processing and search engines.
- January 15, 2008: Changed from a limited company to a joint-stock company.
- July 15, 2008: Provided a related entry display feature for Hatena Co., Ltd.'s Hatena Bookmark.
- June 21, 2010: Library information service Webcat Plus adopted Sedue.
- October 31, 2016: Transferred the business of the integrated search platform Sedue, which was a product of Preferred Infrastructure, to Retrieva Co., Ltd., which was established by the employees of Preferred Infrastructure.

Although it is not currently in operation, the following products were available around 2008:

- Sedue, a large-scale search engine
- Reflexa, an associative search engine
- Viim, a classification-based image search engine
- Hotate, a related article recommendation engine

=== Preferred Networks ===
- March 26, 2014: Established Preferred Networks, Inc. (PFN) with Toru Nishikawa taking office as the representative director.
- October 1, 2014: Initiated joint research with Toyota.
- October 1, 2014: Concluded a capital and business alliance contract with NTT, receiving a 200 million yen investment.
- June 9, 2015: Released the open source deep learning framework Chainer.
- June 11, 2015: Formed a business partnership with Panasonic and FANUC.
- August 21, 2015: Received a 900 million yen investment from FANUC Corporation, with the valuation at 15 billion yen.
- September 18, 2015: Technological alliance with NVIDIA.
- December 30, 2015: Received a 900 million yen investment from Toyota.
- July 2016: Merged with DeNA to form a new company.
- July 2016: Selected as an innovative start-up from Japan at the 2016 US-Japan Innovation Awards.
- October 2016: Established the PFN Cancer Research Institute (PCRI).
- November 2016: Announced business alliance with SCSK and the Asian Frontier Group.
- November 2016: Began an integrated cancer care system development project utilizing artificial intelligence (AI).
- February 2017: Won the Minister of Economy, Trade and Industry Award (Venture & Large Corporation Collaboration Award) at the 3rd Japan Venture Awards.
- April 2017: Cooperated with Intel in the development of the deep learning open source framework Chainer.
- May 2017: Established a strategic cooperation in the field of deep learning solutions with Microsoft.
- May 2017: Collaborated with the drawing communication app "pixiv Sketch" and the line drawing automatic coloring service "PaintsChainer".
- July 2017: Won the "Emerging Leader Award" at the 2017 Japan-U.S. Innovation Awards.
- August 2017: Raised about 10.5 billion yen from Toyota to accelerate the joint research and development of AI technology in the mobility field.
- December 2017: Raised over 2 billion yen in total from FANUC, Hakuhodo DY Holdings, Hitachi, Mizuho Bank, and Mitsui & Co.
- January 2018: Agreed to establish a joint venture company for the development of intelligent edge systems.
- August 2018: Raised about 700 million yen from Chugai Pharmaceutical and about 200 million yen from Tokyo Electron.
- December 12, 2018: Announced the development of a dedicated accelerator MN-Core and a supercomputer MN-3 that utilizes it at SEMICON Japan 2018.
- July 2019: Raised about 1 billion yen from JXTG Holdings (now Eneos Holdings). The valuation was 3,516,745,800 yen. The total amount raised is 16.88 billion yen.
- December 5, 2019: Announced the end of development of the open source deep learning framework Chainer and transition to PyTorch.
- June 23, 2020: The supercomputer MN-3 equipped with the deep learning dedicated accelerator MN-Core achieved first place in the Green500.

=== Preferred Robotics ===
- November 1, 2021: Established Preferred Robotics, a subsidiary of Preferred Networks, and Preferred Robotics raised 2 billion yen from Amano Corporation.
- March 18, 2022: Preferred Robotics raised 300 million yen from Asahi Kasei and 300 million yen from Sumitomo Mitsui Banking Corporation.
- September 20, 2022: Preferred Robotics co-developed the autonomous small floor cleaning robot HAPiiBOT (HapiiBot), which uses AI technology, with Amano Corporation.

=== Preferred Computational Chemistry ===
- June 1, 2021: Established Preferred Computational Chemistry as a joint venture of Preferred Networks and ENEOS Corporation. The investment ratio is PFN 51%, ENEOS 49%.
- July 6, 2021: The general-purpose atomistic simulator Matlantis, which approximates density functional theory (DFT) simulations using a graph neural network, is launched in Japan. Capable of simulating 72 elements, handling up to 20,000 atoms a time, and executing calculations up to 20 million times faster than DFT, Matlantis is rapidly adopted by dozens of major Japanese corporations.
- May 2023: Preferred Computational Chemistry, in partnership with professors at MIT, launch an English-version of Matlantis in the United States.
