= Hyperparameter (machine learning) =

Parameter controlling the machine learning process

In machine learning, a hyperparameter is a parameter that can be set in order to define any configurable part of a model's learning process. Hyperparameters can be classified as either model hyperparameters (such as the topology and size of a neural network) or algorithm hyperparameters (such as the learning rate and the batch size of an optimizer). These are named hyperparameters in contrast to parameters, which are characteristics that the model learns from the data.

Hyperparameters are not required by every model or algorithm. Some simple algorithms such as ordinary least squares regression require none. However, the LASSO algorithm, for example, adds a regularization hyperparameter to ordinary least squares which must be set before training. Even models and algorithms without a strict requirement to define hyperparameters may not produce meaningful results if these are not carefully chosen. However, optimal values for hyperparameters are not always easy to predict. Some hyperparameters may have no meaningful effect, or one important variable may be conditional upon the value of another. Often a separate process of hyperparameter tuning is needed to find a suitable combination for the data and task.

As well as improving model performance, hyperparameters can be used by researchers to introduce robustness and reproducibility into their work, especially if it uses models that incorporate random number generation.

== Considerations ==
The time required to train and test a model can depend upon the choice of its hyperparameters. A hyperparameter is usually of continuous or integer type, leading to mixed-type optimization problems. The existence of some hyperparameters is conditional upon the value of others, e.g. the size of each hidden layer in a neural network can be conditional upon the number of layers. Consequently, hyperparameters may form hierarchical or conditional configuration spaces, where one design choice determines which further hyperparameters are relevant.

=== Difficulty-learnable parameters ===
The objective function is typically non-differentiable with respect to hyperparameters. As a result, in most instances, hyperparameters cannot be learned using gradient-based optimization methods (such as gradient descent), which are commonly employed to learn model parameters. These hyperparameters are those parameters describing a model representation that cannot be learned by common optimization methods, but nonetheless affect the loss function. An example would be the tolerance hyperparameter for errors in support vector machines.

=== Untrainable parameters ===
Sometimes, hyperparameters cannot be learned from the training data because they aggressively increase the capacity of a model and can push the loss function to an undesired minimum (overfitting to the data), as opposed to correctly mapping the richness of the structure in the data. For example, if we treat the degree of a polynomial equation fitting a regression model as a trainable parameter, the degree would increase until the model perfectly fit the data, yielding low training error, but poor generalization performance.

=== Tunability ===
Most performance variation can be attributed to just a few hyperparameters. The tunability of an algorithm, hyperparameter, or interacting hyperparameters is a measure of how much performance can be gained by tuning it. For an LSTM, while the learning rate followed by the network size are its most crucial hyperparameters, batching and momentum have no significant effect on its performance.

Although some research has advocated the use of mini-batch sizes in the thousands, other work has found the best performance with mini-batch sizes between 2 and 32.

=== Robustness ===
An inherent stochasticity in learning directly implies that the empirical hyperparameter performance is not necessarily its true performance. Methods that are not robust to simple changes in hyperparameters, random seeds, or even different implementations of the same algorithm cannot be integrated into mission critical control systems without significant simplification and robustification. In turn, hyperparameter choices can affect not only predictive performance but also the robustness and stability of a model's outputs under changed or noisy input conditions.

Reinforcement learning algorithms, in particular, require measuring their performance over a large number of random seeds, and also measuring their sensitivity to choices of hyperparameters. Their evaluation with a small number of random seeds does not capture performance adequately due to high variance. Some reinforcement learning methods, e.g. DDPG (Deep Deterministic Policy Gradient), are more sensitive to hyperparameter choices than others.

== Optimization ==
Hyperparameter optimization finds a tuple of hyperparameters that yields an optimal model which minimizes a predefined loss function on given test data. The objective function takes a tuple of hyperparameters and returns the associated loss. Typically these methods are not gradient based, and instead apply concepts from derivative-free optimization or black box optimization.

== Reproducibility ==
Apart from tuning hyperparameters, machine learning involves storing and organizing the parameters and results, and making sure they are reproducible. In the absence of a robust infrastructure for this purpose, research code often evolves quickly and compromises essential aspects like bookkeeping and reproducibility. Online collaboration platforms for machine learning go further by allowing scientists to automatically share, organize and discuss experiments, data, and algorithms. Reproducibility can be particularly difficult for deep learning models. For example, research has shown that deep learning models depend very heavily even on the random seed selection of the random number generator.

== See also ==
- Hyper-heuristic
- Replication crisis
