= Bagging =

Bagging may refer to:

- In statistics, data mining and machine learning, bootstrap aggregating
  - The random subspace method, also called attribute bagging
- In mountaineering, peak bagging
- In medicine, ventilating a patient with a bag valve mask
- In agriculture, the bagging hook, a form of reap hook or sickle
- In drug slang, bagging is a form of drug abuse akin to huffing
- Teabagging, a sexual act
