= Adele Cutler =

Statistician

- Education: University of Waikato; University of Auckland; University of California, Berkeley
- Spouse: Richard Cutler
- Scientific career
- Fields: Statistics
- Workplaces: Utah State University
- Thesis: Optimization Methods in Statistics (1988)
- Doctoral advisor: Leo Breiman

Adele Cutler is a statistician known as one of the developers of archetypal analysis and of the random forest technique for ensemble learning. She is a professor of mathematics and statistics at Utah State University.

== Early life and education ==
Originally from England, Cutler moved to New Zealand as a child, and studied mathematics at the University of Waikato and the University of Auckland. She met her husband, statistician Richard Cutler, at the University of Auckland; the couple both went on to graduate study in statistics at the University of California, Berkeley, where she earned a master's degree in 1984 and completed her doctorate in 1988. Her dissertation, Optimization Methods in Statistics, was supervised by Leo Breiman. Her doctoral work with Breiman concerned mathematical optimization techniques in statistics, and introduced archetypal analysis.

== Career ==
After completing her doctorate she joined the faculty at Utah State University in 1988. Her initial research there concerned mixture models, but shifted towards neural networks in the mid-1990s and from there to random decision trees, the basis of the random forest technique.
