= Tin Kam Ho =

Computer scientist

Tin Kam Ho (Chinese: 何天琴) is a computer scientist at IBM Research with contributions to machine learning, data mining, and classification. Ho is noted for introducing random decision forests in 1995, and for her pioneering work in ensemble learning and data complexity analysis. She is an IEEE fellow and IAPR fellow.

== Education ==
Ho completed her undergraduate education at the Chinese University of Hong Kong in 1984. She received a Ph.D. in computer science from State University of New York at Buffalo in 1992.

== Career and research ==
She led the Statistics and Learning Research Department of Bell Labs at Murray Hill, NJ. In 1995, she published the article Random decision forests, which became the foundation of the random forest method commonly used by later data scientists.

Ho also pioneered research in multiple classifier systems, ensemble learning, and data complexity analysis, and pursued applications of automatic learning in reading systems and many areas of science and engineering. She also led major efforts on modeling and monitoring large-scale optical transmission systems. Later she worked on wireless geo-location, video surveillance, smart grid data mining, user profiling, customer experience modeling, and analysis of diagnostic processes.

Since 2014, Ho has been a research scientist in artificial intelligence at IBM. She worked on semantic analysis in natural language processing, contributing to machine learning, data mining, and classification methods at IBM Watson and Watson Health. Thereafter she turned to generative AI applications at IBM Research.

== Awards and recognition ==
- Bell Labs President's Gold Award
- two Bell Labs Teamwork Awards
- 1999 Young Scientist Award from ICDAR
- 2008 Pierre Devijver Award for Statistical Pattern Recognition
- 2024 K.S. Fu prize from IAPR

She served as editor-in-chief of the journal Pattern Recognition Letters in 2004-2010, and in earlier years as associate editor for PAMI, Pattern Recognition, editor for Int. J. on Document Analysis and Recognition, as well as guest editors for other publications.

Ho was elected an IEEE fellow in 2006, and is also an IAPR fellow.
