= 3D structure change detection =

3D Structure Change Detection is a type of change detection process for GIS (geographical information systems). It is a process that measures how the volume of a particular area have changed between two or more time periods. A high-spatial resolution Digital elevation model (DEM) that provides accurate 4-d (space and time) structural information over area of interest is required to compute such changes. In production, two or more DEMs that cover the same area are used to monitor topographic changes of area. By comparing the DEMs made at different times, structure of terrain changes can be realized by the ground elevation difference from DEMs. Details, occurring time and accuracy of such changes are strongly relied on the resolution, quality of DEMs. In general, the problem of involves whether or not a change has occurred, or whether several changes have occurred. Such structure changes detection has been widely used to assess urban growth, impact of natural disasters like earthquake, volcano and battle damage assessment.

== See also ==
- Change detection (GIS)
- Digital elevation model
- Geographic information system
