= Change detection (GIS) =

In geographic information system (GIS), change detection is a process that measures how the attributes of a particular area have changed between two or more time periods. Change detection often involves comparing aerial photographs or satellite imagery of the area taken at different times. Change detection has been widely used to assess shifting cultivation, deforestation, urban growth, impact of natural disasters like tsunamis, earthquakes, and use/land cover changes etc.

== See also ==
- 3D structure change detection
- Spatial analysis
