= Leo Breiman =

American statistician

- Breiman in 2003
- Born: January 27, 1928; New York City, U.S.
- Died: July 5, 2005 (aged 77); Berkeley, California, U.S.
- Education: University of California, Berkeley
- Known for: CART, Bagging, Random forest
- Scientific career
- Fields: Statistics
- Workplaces: University of California, Berkeley
- Thesis: Homogeneous Processes (1954)
- Doctoral advisor: Michel Loève
- Doctoral students: Adele Cutler; Sam Buttrey

Leo Breiman (January 27, 1928 – July 5, 2005) was an American statistician at the University of California, Berkeley. He was elected a member of the National Academy of Sciences and the American Academy of Arts and Sciences.

Breiman's work helped to bridge the gap between statistics and computer science, particularly in the field of machine learning. His most important contributions were his work on classification and regression trees, and ensembles of trees fit to bootstrap samples. Breiman coined the term bagging for the process of bootstrap aggregation. Breiman's paper on the random forest is one of the top 10 most-cited papers in machine learning.

== Early life and education ==
Leo Breiman was born in New York City as the only child of Eastern European immigrants Max and Lena Breiman. Max was a tailor and sewing machine operator, and Lena was a housewife. The Breiman family moved to California when Leo was five, with Leo eventually graduating from Roosevelt High School in Los Angeles in 1945.

Breiman earned a bachelor's degree in physics from the California Institute of Technology in 1949. A year later, he received a master's degree in mathematics from Columbia University. In 1954, Breiman earned his Ph.D. from the University of California, Berkeley.

== Career ==
Breiman's first position post-doctorate was to teach probability theory at the University of California, Los Angeles, where he eventually earned tenure. Breiman eventually resigned his position to publish the first edition of the textbook "Probability" in 1968.

In 1980, Breiman joined the faculty at the University of California, Berkeley, where he established the Department's Statistical Computing Facility. Despite retiring in 1993, Breiman continued to receive National Science Foundation grants and supervise Ph.D. students. His work on random forests was published in 2001.

== See also ==
- Shannon–McMillan–Breiman theorem
