= Resampled efficient frontier =

Technique for constructing investment portfolios

Resampled efficient frontier is a technique in investment portfolio construction under modern portfolio theory to use a set of portfolios and then average them to create an effective portfolio. This will not necessarily be the optimal portfolio, but a portfolio that is more balanced between risk and the rate of return. It is used when an investor or analyst is faced with determining which asset classes, such as domestic fixed income, domestic equity, foreign fixed income, and foreign equity, to invest in and what proportion of the total portfolio should be of each asset class.

== History ==
In 1959, Harry Markowitz first described a method for constructing a portfolio with optimal risk/return characteristics. His portfolio optimization method finds the minimum risk portfolio with a given expected return. Because the Markowitz or Mean-Variance Efficient Portfolio is calculated from the sample mean and covariance, which are likely different from the population mean and covariance, the resulting investment portfolio may allocate too much weight to assets with better estimated than true risk/return characteristics.

== Operation ==
To account for the uncertainty of the sample estimates, a financial analyst can create many alternative efficient frontiers based on resampled versions of the data. Each resampled dataset will result in a different set of Markowitz efficient portfolios. These efficient frontiers of portfolios can then be averaged to create a resampled efficient frontier.

The appropriate compromise between the investor's Risk aversion and desired return will then guide the financial analyst to choose a portfolio from the set of resampled efficient frontier portfolios. Since such a portfolio is different from the Markowitz efficient portfolio it will have suboptimal risk/return characteristics with respect to the sample mean and covariance, but optimal characteristics when averaged over the many possible values of the unknown true mean and covariance. Resampled Efficiency is covered by U. S. patent #6,003,018, patent pending worldwide. New Frontier Advisors, LLC, has exclusive worldwide licensing rights.
