= Peter Nordin =

Swedish computer scientist (1965–2020)

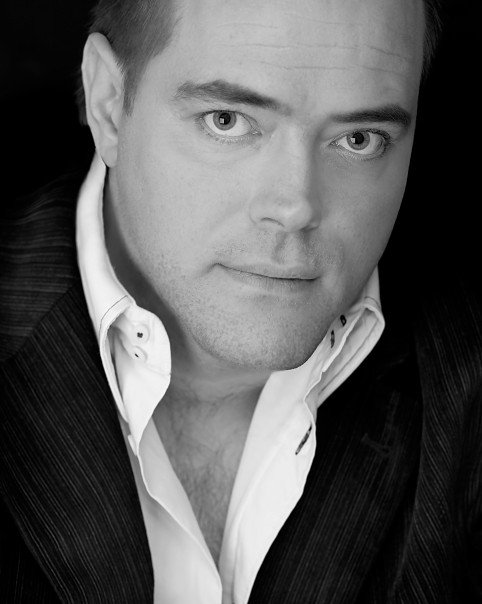
- Born: 9 August 1965; Helsingborg, Sweden
- Died: 12 October 2020 (aged 55)
- Education: University of Dortmund; Chalmers University of Technology; University of Gothenburg
- Scientific career
- Fields: Evolutionary robotics Artificial intelligence Text mining Complex Systems
- Workplaces: iRobis

Peter Nordin (9 August 1965 – 12 October 2020) was a Swedish computer scientist, entrepreneur and author who has contributed to artificial intelligence, automatic programming, machine learning, and evolutionary robotics.

== Studies and early career ==
Peter Nordin was born in 1965 in Helsingborg but moved to Gothenburg in 1967, where he was raised. He began studies at Chalmers University of Technology in 1984 and completed the M.S. in computer science and engineering in 1988 and studied economics. He then worked as a knowledge engineer for artificial intelligence (AI) company, Infologics AB, focusing on research and development of knowledge-based systems and complex system configuration.

Nordin began his research while at Infologics AB, Sweden. His work led to several European research projects (ESPRIT) including projects in machine learning (autonomous vehicles) and methodologies for AI system development. He began his research in Genetic Programming (GP) in 1992. In 1993, he started Dacapo AB, a research and development company. He invented a method for automatic induction of binary machine code using genetic programming and researched how to produce machine code with genetic programming. In 1997 he co-founded the American company RML Technologies, Inc. with commercial GP software. Nordin spent a large portion of 1995 and 1996 at the University of Dortmund, where he completed his doctoral studies. At Dortmund University he initiated research in evolutionary robotics. and demonstrated that GP can be used for real-time, on-line training and control of robotic systems.

In 1998, he co-authored a textbook on genetic programming. Peter Nordin created a search engine company in 1999, VILL AB (with global search engine wannasee.com) as well as another AI-company, Tific AB for automated support, and received the year's Sten Gustafsson prize for entrepreneuring, awarded by the Royal Swedish Academy of Engineering Sciences. At the time, he was also the co-founder of Chalmers's Medialab and was on the board of the Swedish AI Society. He was chair of the second European Conference on Genetic Programming, EuroGP 1999, now part of EvoStar.

== Robots and commercialization of AI ==
During 1998–2003, he was an associate professor at Chalmers’ complex adaptive systems (CAS). For a short period he led an international master's degree program in CAS, which he co-founded. He led the master's program and supervised construction of GP-based adaptive physical robots. During this time, he also started Chalmers's Humanoid Project resulted in Sweden's first full-scale humanoid robots; Elvis, Elvina, and Priscilla, which currently reside in Sweden's National Museum of Science and Technology. Robots from the Humanoid Project participated in "RoboCup" soccer matches for humanoid robots He also founded the first European company for humanoid technology: the Estonian company European Humanoids OY. Several of Nordin's students have created their own humanoid projects, such as Davide Faconti and the REEM-B robot and Almir Heralic with HR2. Much of this earlier work focused on evolutionary robotic training methods for: problem solving, sound and image processing, perception and advanced non-linear low-level control. Robots have also learned to walk on two legs without having foreknowledge by simulating the behaviour. The robot Elvis, attracted some media interest internationally. The world's first flying "flapping" adaptive ornithopter robot appeared in TV and other media. The popular science book; "Humanoider: Självlärande robotar och artificiell intelligens”, was one result of this public interest.

During his time at Chalmers, he started another ten spin-off companies based on his research. He had a number of patents, all related to genetic programming and evolutionary methods. He was a co-founder of the Institute of Robotics in Scandinavia. From 2013 Peter Nordin was an adjoint professor at Chalmers in Göteborg, Sweden.

Nordin was seen in the public debate on treatment of gifted children and is an advisor for the Mensa International Process, both he and his wife were active members of Mensa International.

He lived with wife Carina and 6 children outside Gothenburg in Askim.

== Career summary, research ==
Peter Nordin had a PhD in Computer Science at University of Dortmund (1997) and a degree in computer science and engineering from Chalmers University of Technology in Gothenburg, Sweden (1988). His later research included commercial evolutionary robotics software and software for a complete cognitive system for robots. His earlier research included Evolutionary software architecture for robotics, the invention of evolutionary induction of mathematical proofs and of binary machine language, speech and vision recognition, and linear genetic programming for internet search. He researched analysis of genetic programming through complexity theory.

Peter Nordin was the inventor of the ALLAN-method for Artificial General Intelligence based on complexity measures i.e. Speed Prior using random strings as reinforcement to create a Universal Artificial Intelligence.
