= Alex Graves (computer scientist) =

Scottish computer scientist

- Education: University of Edinburgh (BSc); Technical University of Munich (PhD)
- Known for: Connectionist temporal classification; Neural Turing machine; Differentiable neural computer
- Scientific career
- Fields: Artificial Intelligence; Recurrent neural networks; Handwriting recognition; Speech recognition
- Workplaces: DeepMind; University of Toronto; Dalle Molle Institute for Artificial Intelligence Research; InstaDeep
- Thesis: Supervised sequence labelling with recurrent neural networks (2008)
- Doctoral advisor: Jürgen Schmidhuber
- Website: www.cs.toronto.edu/~graves

Alex Graves is a computer scientist.

== Education ==
Graves earned his Bachelor of Science degree in Theoretical Physics from the University of Edinburgh and a PhD in artificial intelligence from the Technical University of Munich supervised by Jürgen Schmidhuber at the Dalle Molle Institute for Artificial Intelligence Research.

== Career and research ==
After his PhD, Graves was postdoc working with Schmidhuber at the Technical University of Munich and Geoffrey Hinton at the University of Toronto.

At the Dalle Molle Institute for Artificial Intelligence Research, Graves trained long short-term memory (LSTM) neural networks by a novel method called connectionist temporal classification (CTC). This method outperformed traditional speech recognition models in certain applications. In 2009, his CTC-trained LSTM was the first recurrent neural network (RNN) to win pattern recognition contests, winning several competitions in connected handwriting recognition. Google uses CTC-trained LSTM for speech recognition on the smartphone.

Graves is also the creator of neural Turing machines and the closely related differentiable neural computer. In 2023, he wrote the paper Bayesian Flow Networks. He currently works as a Staff Research Scientist at InstaDeep. He was previously a research scientist at Google DeepMind in London.
