= Shane Legg =

New Zealand AI researcher (born 1973/4)

Shane Legg CBE
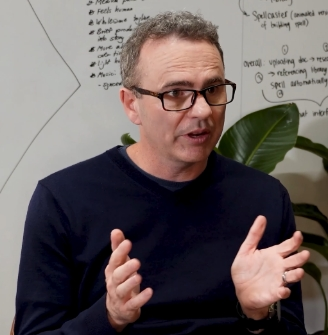
- Legg in 2023
- Born: 1973; New Zealand
- Education: University of Waikato (BCMS); University of Auckland (MSc); University of Lugano (PhD)
- Known for: DeepMind Technologies
- Scientific career
- Fields: Artificial intelligence; Machine learning; AI Safety
- Workplaces: Google DeepMind; University College London
- Thesis: Machine Super Intelligence (2008)
- Doctoral advisor: Marcus Hutter

Shane Legg CBE (born 1973 or 1974) is a New Zealand machine learning researcher and entrepreneur. With Demis Hassabis and Mustafa Suleyman, he cofounded DeepMind Technologies (later bought by Google and now called Google DeepMind), and works there as the chief AGI scientist. He is also known for his academic work on artificial general intelligence, including his thesis supervised by Marcus Hutter.

== Early life and education ==
Legg attended Rotorua Lakes High School in Rotorua, on New Zealand's North Island. He completed his undergraduate studies at Waikato University in 1996. Also in 1996, he obtained his MSc degree with a thesis entitled "Solomonoff Induction", with Cristian S. Calude at the University of Auckland.

== Research interests ==
In the early 2000s, Legg re-introduced and popularized with Ben Goertzel the term "artificial general intelligence" (AGI), to describe an AI that can do practically any cognitive task a human can do. At that time, talking about AGI "would put you on the lunatic fringe".

Legg is known for his concern of existential risk from AI, highlighted in 2011 in an interview on LessWrong and in 2023 he signed the statement on AI risk of extinction.

== Career ==
Before his PhD and before cofounding DeepMind, Shane Legg worked at "a number of software development positions at private companies", including the "big data firm Adaptive Intelligence" and the startup WebMind founded by Ben Goertzel.

=== Research ===
Legg later obtained a PhD at the Dalle Molle Institute for Artificial Intelligence Research (IDSIA), a joint research institute of USI Università della Svizzera italiana and SUPSI. He worked on theoretical models of super intelligent machines (AIXI) with Marcus Hutter, and completed in 2008 his doctoral thesis entitled "Machine Super Intelligence". He then went on to complete a postdoctoral fellowship in finance at USI, and began a further fellowship at University College London's Gatsby Computational Neuroscience Unit.

=== DeepMind ===
Demis Hassabis and Shane Legg first met in 2009 at University College London, where Legg was a postdoctoral researcher.

In 2010, Legg cofounded the start-up DeepMind Technologies along with Demis Hassabis and Mustafa Suleyman. DeepMind Technologies was bought in 2014 by Google. After the merge with Google Brain in 2023, the company is now known as Google DeepMind.

According to a 2017 article, a significant part of his job as the chief scientist was to supervise recruitment, to decide where DeepMind should focus its efforts, and to lead DeepMind's AI safety work.

As of July 2023, Legg works at Google DeepMind as the Chief AGI Scientist.

== Awards and honors ==
Legg was awarded the $10,000 prize of the Singularity Institute for Artificial Intelligence for his PhD done in 2008.

Legg was appointed Commander of the Order of the British Empire (CBE) in the 2019 Birthday Honours for services to the science and technology sector and to investment.
