= Dalle Molle Institute for Semantic and Cognitive Studies =

Research institute in Geneva, Switzerland

- Istituto Dalle Molle per gli studi semantici e cognitivi Institut Dalle Molle pour les études sémantiques et cognitives
- Formation: 1972
- Type: research institute
- Purpose: research into application of artificial intelligence to language
- Headquarters: Geneva
- Founder: Angelo Dalle Molle
- Parent organization: Fondation Dalle Molle
- Affiliations: University of Geneva
- Website: dallemolle.ch/les-instituts/#issco

The Dalle Molle Institute for Semantic and Cognitive Studies (Italian: Istituto Dalle Molle per gli studi semantici e cognitivi or ISSCO) is a research institute in Geneva, Switzerland. It was founded in Lugano in 1972 by Angelo Dalle Molle through the Fondation Dalle Molle, to conduct research into the application of artificial intelligence to linguistics, cognitive science and semantics with the aim of developing systems for automated translation. Since 1976 it has been a part of the Faculté de Traduction et d'Interprétation, the faculty of translation and interpreting, of the University of Geneva.

ISSCO is one of four Swiss research organisations founded by the Dalle Molle foundation, of which three are in the field of artificial intelligence.
