= Intelligence =

Ability to perceive, infer, retain or apply information

Intelligence has been defined in many ways: the capacity for abstraction, logic, understanding, self-awareness, learning, emotional knowledge, reasoning, planning, creativity, critical thinking, and problem-solving. It can be described as the ability to perceive or infer information and to retain it as knowledge to be applied to adaptive behaviors within an environment or context.

The term rose to prominence during the early 1900s. Most psychologists believe that intelligence can be divided into various domains or competencies.

Intelligence has been long-studied in humans, and across numerous disciplines. It has also been observed in the cognition of non-human animals. Some researchers have suggested that plants exhibit forms of intelligence, though this remains controversial.

== Etymology ==
The word intelligence derives from the Latin nouns intelligentia or intellēctus, which in turn stems from the verb intelligere, to comprehend or perceive. In the Middle Ages, the word intellectus became the scholarly technical term for understanding and a translation for the Greek philosophical term nous. This term, however, was strongly linked to the metaphysical and cosmological theories of teleological scholasticism, including theories of the immortality of the soul, and the concept of the active intellect (also known as the active intelligence). This approach to the study of nature was strongly rejected by early modern philosophers such as Francis Bacon, Thomas Hobbes, John Locke, and David Hume, all of whom preferred "understanding" (in place of "intellectus" or "intelligence") in their English philosophical works. Hobbes, for example, in his Latin De Corpore, used "intellectus intelligit", translated in the English version as "the understanding understandeth", as a typical example of a logical absurdity. "Intelligence" has therefore become less common in English language philosophy, but it has later been taken up (with the scholastic theories that it now implies) in more contemporary psychology.

== Definitions ==
There is controversy over how to define intelligence. Scholars describe its constituent abilities in various ways, and differ in the degree to which they conceive of intelligence as quantifiable.

A consensus report called Intelligence: Knowns and Unknowns, published in 1995 by the Board of Scientific Affairs of the American Psychological Association, states:

Individuals differ from one another in their ability to understand complex ideas, to adapt effectively to the environment, to learn from experience, to engage in various forms of reasoning, to overcome obstacles by taking thought. Although these individual differences can be substantial, they are never entirely consistent: a given person's intellectual performance will vary on different occasions, in different domains, as judged by different criteria. Concepts of "intelligence" are attempts to clarify and organize this complex set of phenomena. Although considerable clarity has been achieved in some areas, no such conceptualization has yet answered all the important questions, and none commands universal assent. Indeed, when two dozen prominent theorists were recently asked to define intelligence, they gave two dozen, somewhat different, definitions.

Psychologists and learning researchers have suggested definitions of intelligence such as the following:

Researcher	Quotation
Alfred Binet	Judgment, otherwise called "good sense", "practical sense", "initiative", the faculty of adapting one's self to circumstances ... auto-critique.
David Wechsler	The aggregate or global capacity of the individual to act purposefully, to think rationally, and to deal effectively with his environment.
Lloyd Humphreys	"...the resultant of the process of acquiring, storing in memory, retrieving, combining, comparing, and using in new contexts information and conceptual skills".
Howard Gardner	To my mind, a human intellectual competence must entail a set of skills of problem solving—enabling the individual to resolve genuine problems or difficulties that he or she encounters and, when appropriate, to create an effective product—and must also entail the potential for finding or creating problems—and thereby laying the groundwork for the acquisition of new knowledge.
Robert Sternberg & William Salter	Goal-directed adaptive behavior.
Reuven Feuerstein	The theory of Structural Cognitive Modifiability describes intelligence as "the unique propensity of human beings to change or modify the structure of their cognitive functioning to adapt to the changing demands of a life situation".
Shane Legg & Marcus Hutter	A synthesis of 70+ definitions from psychology, philosophy, and AI researchers: "Intelligence measures an agent's ability to achieve goals in a wide range of environments", which has been mathematically formalized.
Alexander Wissner-Gross	F = T ∇ S$_\tau$ "Intelligence is a force, F, that acts so as to maximize future freedom of action. It acts to maximize future freedom of action, or keep options open, with some strength T, with the diversity of possible accessible futures, S, up to some future time horizon, τ. In short, intelligence doesn't like to get trapped".

== Human ==
Human intelligence is the intellectual power of humans, which is marked by complex cognitive feats and high levels of motivation and self-awareness. Intelligence enables humans to remember descriptions of things and use those descriptions in future behaviors. It gives humans the cognitive abilities to learn, form concepts, understand, and reason, including the capacities to recognize patterns, innovate, plan, solve problems, and employ language to communicate. These cognitive abilities can be organized into frameworks like fluid vs. crystallized and the Unified Cattell-Horn-Carroll model, which contains abilities like fluid reasoning, perceptual speed, verbal abilities, and others.

Intelligence is different from learning. Learning refers to the act of retaining facts and information or abilities and being able to recall them for future use. Intelligence, on the other hand, is the cognitive ability of someone to perform these and other processes.

=== Intelligence quotient (IQ) ===
There have been various attempts to quantify intelligence via psychometric testing. Prominent among these are the various Intelligence Quotient (IQ) tests, which were first developed in the early 20th century to screen children for intellectual disability. Over time, IQ tests became more pervasive, being used to screen immigrants, military recruits, and job applicants. As the tests became more popular, belief that IQ tests measure a fundamental and unchanging attribute that all humans possess became widespread.

An influential theory that promoted the idea that IQ measures a fundamental quality possessed by every person is the theory of General Intelligence, or g factor. The g factor is a construct that summarizes the correlations observed between an individual's scores on a range of cognitive tests.

Today, most psychologists agree that IQ measures at least some aspects of human intelligence, particularly the ability to thrive in an academic context. However, many psychologists question the validity of IQ tests as a measure of intelligence as a whole. Studies in which people complete repeated cognitive assessments over 36-93 days indicate that the results of studies using single snapshot assessments of cognitive functioning should be interpreted with caution.

There is debate about the heritability of IQ, that is, what proportion of differences in IQ test performance between individuals are explained by genetic or environmental factors. The scientific consensus is that genetics does not explain average differences in IQ test performance between racial groups.

=== Emotional ===
Emotional intelligence is thought to be the ability to convey emotion to others in an understandable way as well as to read the emotions of others accurately. Some theories imply that a heightened emotional intelligence could also lead to faster generating and processing of emotions in addition to the accuracy. In addition, higher emotional intelligence is thought to help us manage emotions, which is beneficial for our problem-solving skills. Emotional intelligence is important to our mental health and has ties to social intelligence.

=== Social ===
Social intelligence is the ability to understand the social cues and motivations of others and oneself in social situations. It is thought to be distinct from other types of intelligence, but has relations to emotional intelligence. Social intelligence has coincided with other studies that focus on how we make judgements of others, the accuracy with which we do so, and why people would be viewed as having positive or negative social character. There is debate as to whether or not these studies and social intelligence come from the same theories or if there is a distinction between them, and they are generally thought to be of two different schools of thought.

=== Moral ===
Moral intelligence is the capacity to understand right from wrong and to behave based on the value that is believed to be right. It is considered a distinct form of intelligence, independent of both emotional and cognitive intelligence.

=== Book smart and street smart ===
Concepts of "book smarts" and "street smart" are contrasting views based on the premise that some people have knowledge gained through academic study, but may lack the experience to sensibly apply that knowledge, while others have knowledge gained through practical experience but may lack accurate information usually gained through study by which to effectively apply that knowledge. Artificial intelligence researcher Hector Levesque has noted that:

Given the importance of learning through text in our own personal lives and in our culture, it is perhaps surprising how utterly dismissive we tend to be of it. It is sometimes derided as being merely "book knowledge", and having it is being "book smart". In contrast, knowledge acquired through direct experience and apprenticeship is called "street knowledge", and having it is being "street smart".

== Nonhuman animal ==
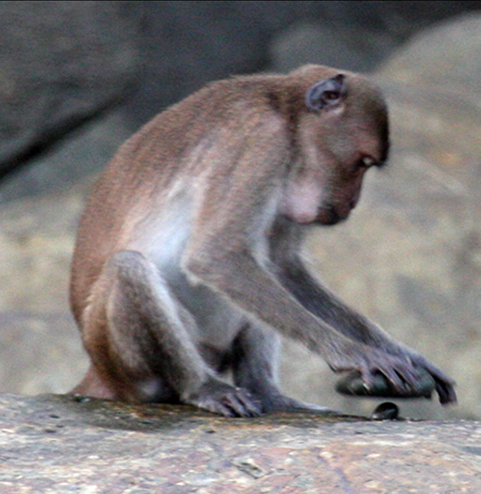
A crab-eating macaque using a stone

Although humans have been the primary focus of intelligence researchers, scientists have also attempted to investigate animal intelligence, or more broadly, animal cognition. These researchers are interested in studying both mental ability in a particular species, and comparing abilities between species. They study various measures of problem solving, as well as numerical and verbal reasoning abilities. Some challenges include defining intelligence so it has the same meaning across species, and operationalizing a measure that accurately compares mental ability across species and contexts.

Wolfgang Köhler's research on the intelligence of apes is an example of research in this area, as is Stanley Coren's book, The Intelligence of Dogs. Non-human animals particularly noted and studied for their intelligence include chimpanzees, bonobos (notably the language-using Kanzi) and other great apes, dolphins, elephants and to some extent parrots, rats and ravens.

Cephalopod intelligence provides an important comparative study. Cephalopods appear to exhibit characteristics of significant intelligence, yet their nervous systems differ radically from those of backboned animals. Vertebrates such as mammals, birds, reptiles and fish have shown a fairly high degree of intellect that varies according to each species. The same is true with arthropods.

=== g factor in non-humans ===
Evidence of a general factor of intelligence has been observed in non-human animals. First described in humans, the g factor has since been identified in a number of non-human species.

Cognitive ability and intelligence cannot be measured using the same, largely verbally dependent, scales developed for humans. Instead, intelligence is measured using a variety of interactive and observational tools focusing on innovation, habit reversal, social learning, and responses to novelty. Studies have shown that g is responsible for 47% of the individual variance in cognitive ability measures in primates and between 55% and 60% of the variance in mice (Locurto, Locurto). These values are similar to the accepted variance in IQ explained by g in humans (40–50%).

== Plant ==
It has been argued that plants should also be classified as intelligent based on their ability to sense and model external and internal environments and adjust their morphology, physiology and phenotype accordingly to ensure self-preservation and reproduction.

A counter argument is that intelligence is commonly understood to involve the creation and use of persistent memories as opposed to computation that does not involve learning. If this is accepted as definitive of intelligence, then it includes the artificial intelligence of robots capable of "machine learning", but excludes those purely autonomic sense-reaction responses that can be observed in many plants. Plants are not limited to automated sensory-motor responses; however, they are capable of discriminating positive and negative experiences and of "learning" (registering memories) from their past experiences. They are also capable of communication, accurately computing their circumstances, using sophisticated cost–benefit analysis and taking tightly controlled actions to mitigate and control the diverse environmental stressors.

== Artificial ==
Scholars studying artificial intelligence have proposed definitions of intelligence that include the intelligence demonstrated by machines. Some of these definitions are meant to be general enough to encompass human and other animal intelligence as well. An intelligent agent can be defined as a system that perceives its environment and takes actions which maximize its chances of success. Kaplan and Haenlein define artificial intelligence as "a system's ability to correctly interpret external data, to learn from such data, and to use those learnings to achieve specific goals and tasks through flexible adaptation". Progress in artificial intelligence can be demonstrated in benchmarks ranging from games to practical tasks such as protein folding. Existing AI lags humans in terms of general intelligence, which is sometimes defined as the "capacity to learn how to carry out a huge range of tasks".

Mathematician Olle Häggström defines intelligence in terms of "optimization power", an agent's capacity for efficient cross-domain optimization of the world according to the agent's preferences, or more simply the ability to "steer the future into regions of possibility ranked high in a preference ordering". In this optimization framework, Deep Blue has the power to "steer a chessboard's future into a subspace of possibility which it labels as 'winning', despite attempts by Garry Kasparov to steer the future elsewhere." Hutter and Legg, after surveying the literature, define intelligence as "an agent's ability to achieve goals in a wide range of environments". While cognitive ability is sometimes measured as a one-dimensional parameter, it could also be represented as a "hypersurface in a multidimensional space" to compare systems that are good at different intellectual tasks. Some skeptics believe that there is no meaningful way to define intelligence, aside from "just pointing to ourselves".

== See also ==
- Active intellect
- Cattell–Horn–Carroll theory
- Extraterrestrial intelligence, also referred to as Non-Human Intelligence
- Intellect
- Intelligence (journal)
- Knowledge
- Neuroscience and intelligence
- Outline of human intelligence
- Passive intellect
- Superintelligence
- Sapience
