= Gato (DeepMind) =

Multimodal neural network

- Original author: DeepMind
- Initial release: May 12, 2022
- Website: www.deepmind.com

Gato is a deep neural network for a range of complex tasks that exhibits multimodality. It can perform tasks such as engaging in a dialogue, playing video games, controlling a robot arm to stack blocks, and more.

== Overview ==
Gato was created by researchers at London-based AI firm DeepMind. It is a transformer, like GPT-3. According to MIT Technology Review, the system "learns multiple different tasks at the same time, which means it can switch between them without having to forget one skill before learning another" whereas "[t]he AI systems of today are called “narrow,” meaning they can only do a specific, restricted set of tasks such as generate text", and according to The Independent, it is a "'generalist agent' that can carry out a huge range of complex tasks, from stacking blocks to writing poetry". It uses supervised learning with 1.2B parameters. The technology has been described as "general purpose" artificial intelligence and a "step toward" artificial general intelligence.
