= Angelo Dalle Molle =

Italian businessman and Utopian philanthropist

- Born: 4 November 1908; Mestre
- Died: 2001 or 2002; Stra, Veneto
- Occupations: businessman, philanthropist
- Known for: Cynar, Dalle Molle Foundation

Angelo Dalle Molle (4 November 1908 – 2001 or 2002) was an Italian businessman and Utopian philanthropist. In 1952 he invented and patented Cynar, a bitter aperitivo based on artichoke leaves.

== Business life ==
Dalle Molle was born in Mestre, on the lagoon of Venice, on 4 November 1908. After the Second World War he and his brothers took over G.B. Pezziol, a distillery in the Arcella quarter of Padua; there, with the help of Rino Dondi Pinton, they developed Cynar, a bitter aperitivo/digestivo based on artichoke leaves. It was launched and patented in 1948 or 1952, and quickly became popular, partly as a result of the slogan "contro il logorio della vita moderna", "against the stress of modern life", and the appearances on Carosello of Ernesto Calindri drinking it in the midst of the Milan traffic. The company later acquired the Crodo mineral water company which made the non-alcoholic bitter aperitivo Crodino. In 1976 he sold his company to the Dutch group Bols (though he retained the rights to the slogan); he then used the proceeds of the sale to buy a controlling share-holding. He also bought the Villa La Barbariga at Stra, on the Brenta Canal, and became a patron of the arts and of social and scientific research.

== Patronage and projects ==
Dalle Molle believed that information technology could or should improve the quality of life, and in 1971 established the Fondation Dalle Molle pour la qualité de la vie, or Dalle Molle Foundation for the Quality of Life, to promote research into ways in which it might do so, including artificial intelligence. Through it he set up four research institutes in Switzerland.

=== Research institutes ===
The Dalle Molle Institute for Semantic and Cognitive Studies or Istituto Dalle Molle di Studi Semantici e Cognitivi was established in Lugano in 1972 to conduct research into the application of artificial intelligence to linguistics and automated translation. It became part of the faculty of translation and interpreting of the University of Geneva in 1976.

In 1988 he started the Dalle Molle Institute for Artificial Intelligence Research or Istituto Dalle Molle di Studi sull'Intelligenza Artificiale, also in Lugano, to undertake research into machine learning and adaptation. It became a public research institute in 2000, and is affiliated with the Scuola universitaria professionale della Svizzera italiana and the Università della Svizzera italiana in Lugano.

The Centre de Recherches sur les Plantes Médicinales et Aromatiques or Mediplant was also established in 1988, in Conthey in the Canton du Valais.

The Istituto Dalle Molle di Intelligenza Artificiale Percettiva was set up in Martigny in the Canton du Valais in 1991, the twentieth anniversary of the Fondation Dalle Molle, in collaboration with the École polytechnique fédérale de Lausanne and local, cantonal and federal government bodies. Its purpose was to research applications of artificial intelligence to human perception. It became independent of the Fondation in 1996, and is now called the Idiap Research Institute.

Dalle Molle also founded the Centro Studi della Barbariga, which among other projects designed a series of electric vehicles, including cars, a taxi, a van and an ambulance. About 200 of them were built, in a small manufactory in the gardens of the villa. Seven cars are now in the collection of the Museo dell'automobile Bonfanti-Vimar at Romano d'Ezzelino in the province of Vicenza, in the Veneto.

== Personal life ==
Dalle Molle had relationships and children with several women. He was married only twice. His first marriage was to either Pierina Altieri or Edes Zago, and ended with a papal annulment; he adopted her son. He had five other children with two other women. At the age of 90 he married Eleonora Bötner, who was 40 years younger, and to whom on his death – in either 2001 or 2002 – he left about €32 million.
