= Sepp Hochreiter =

German computer scientist

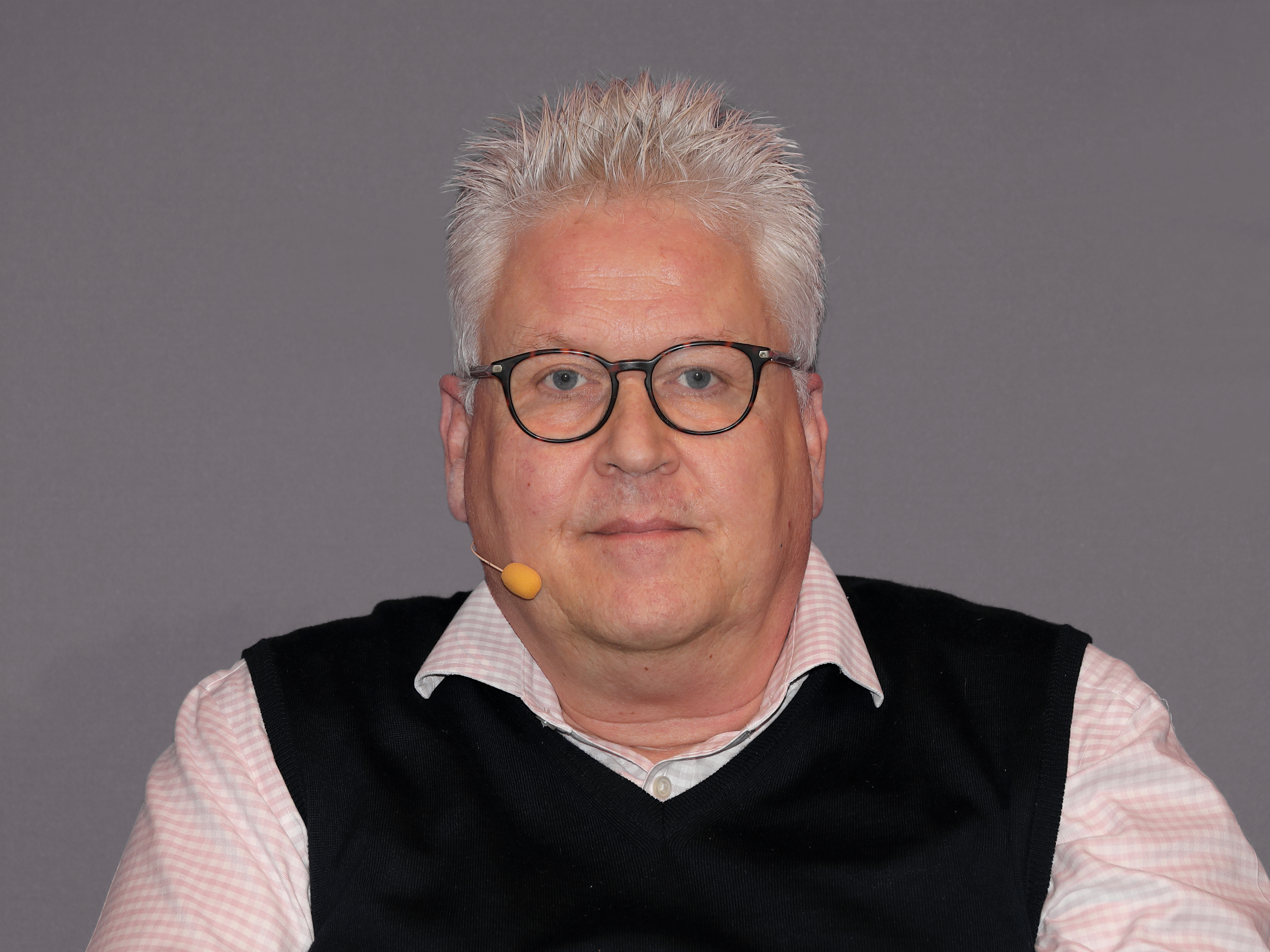
- Hochreiter in 2025
- Born: 14 February 1967 (age 59); Mühldorf, West Germany
- Education: Technical University of Munich
- Scientific career
- Fields: Machine learning, bioinformatics
- Workplaces: Johannes Kepler University Linz
- Thesis: Generalisierung bei neuronalen Netzen geringer Komplexität (1999)
- Doctoral advisor: Wilfried Brauer

Josef "Sepp" Hochreiter (born 14 February 1967) is a German computer scientist. Since 2018 he has led the Institute for Machine Learning at the Johannes Kepler University of Linz after having led the Institute of Bioinformatics from 2006 to 2018. In 2017 he became the head of the Linz Institute of Technology (LIT) AI Lab. Hochreiter is also a founding director of the Institute of Advanced Research in Artificial Intelligence (IARAI). Previously, he was at Technische Universität Berlin, at University of Colorado Boulder, and at the Technical University of Munich. He is a chair of the Critical Assessment of Massive Data Analysis (CAMDA) conference.

Hochreiter has made contributions in the fields of machine learning, deep learning and bioinformatics, most notably the development of the long short-term memory (LSTM) neural network architecture, but also in meta-learning, reinforcement learning and biclustering with application to bioinformatics data.

== Scientific career ==
=== Long short-term memory (LSTM) ===
Hochreiter developed the long short-term memory (LSTM) neural network architecture in his diploma thesis in 1991 leading to the main publication in 1997. LSTM overcomes the problem of numerical instability in training recurrent neural networks (RNNs) that prevents them from learning from long sequences (vanishing or exploding gradient). In 2007, Hochreiter and others successfully applied LSTM with an optimized architecture to very fast protein homology detection without requiring a sequence alignment. LSTM networks have also been used in Google Voice for transcription and search, and in the Google Allo chat app for generating response suggestion with low latency.

=== Other machine learning contributions ===
Beyond LSTM, Hochreiter has developed "Flat Minimum Search" to increase the generalization of neural networks and introduced rectified factor networks (RFNs) for sparse coding which have been applied in bioinformatics and genetics. Hochreiter introduced modern Hopfield networks with continuous states and applied them to the task of immune repertoire classification.

Hochreiter worked with Jürgen Schmidhuber in the field of reinforcement learning on actor-critic systems that learn by "backpropagation through a model".

Hochreiter has been involved in the development of factor analysis methods with application to bioinformatics, including FABIA for biclustering, HapFABIA for detecting short segments of identity by descent and FARMS for preprocessing and summarizing high-density oligonucleotide DNA microarrays to analyze RNA gene expression.

In 2006, Hochreiter and others proposed an extension of the support vector machine (SVM), the "Potential Support Vector Machine" (PSVM), which can be applied to non-square kernel matrices and can be used with kernels that are not positive definite. Hochreiter and his collaborators have applied PSVM to feature selection, including gene selection for microarray data.

== Awards ==
Hochreiter was awarded the IEEE CIS Neural Networks Pioneer Prize in 2021 for his work on LSTM.
