= Jan Leike =

AI alignment researcher

- Born: 1986 or 1987
- Education: University of Freiburg (BS, MS); Australian National University (PhD)
- Known for: Co-lead of OpenAI's "superalignment" project
- Scientific career
- Fields: AI alignment, AI safety, machine learning
- Workplaces: DeepMind; OpenAI; Anthropic; Future of Humanity Institute
- Doctoral advisor: Marcus Hutter

Jan Leike (born 1986 or 1987) is an AI alignment researcher who has worked at DeepMind and OpenAI. He joined Anthropic in May 2024.

== Education ==
Jan Leike obtained his undergraduate degree from the University of Freiburg in Germany. After earning a master's degree in computer science, he pursued a PhD in machine learning at the Australian National University under the supervision of Marcus Hutter.

== Career ==
Leike made a six-month postdoctoral fellowship at the Future of Humanity Institute before joining DeepMind to focus on empirical AI safety research, where he collaborated with Shane Legg.

=== OpenAI ===
In 2021, Leike joined OpenAI. In June 2023, he and Ilya Sutskever became the co-leaders of the newly introduced "superalignment" project, which aimed to determine how to align future artificial superintelligences within four years to ensure their safety. This project involved automating AI alignment research using relatively advanced AI systems. At the time, Sutskever was OpenAI's Chief Scientist, and Leike was the Head of Alignment. Leike was featured in Time's list of the 100 most influential personalities in AI, both in 2023 and in 2024. In May 2024, Leike announced his resignation from OpenAI, following the departure of Sutskever, Daniel Kokotajlo and several other AI safety employees from the company. Leike wrote that "Over the past years, safety culture and processes have taken a backseat to shiny products", and that he "gradually lost trust" in OpenAI's leadership.

In May 2024, Leike joined Anthropic, an AI company founded by former OpenAI employees.
