= Solomonov =

Solomonov is a surname, it may refer to:

- Solomonoff induction or Inductive inference, a theory of predicting based on observations
- Doina Furcoi Solomonov (born 1945), Romanian handball player
- Ray Solomonoff (1926–2009), mathematician involved in machine learning
