= Universal psychometrics =

Psychometrics for any intelligent agent

Universal psychometrics encompasses psychometrics instruments that could measure the psychological properties of any intelligent agent. Up until the early 21st century, psychometrics relied heavily on psychological tests that require the subject to cooperate and answer questions, the most famous example being an intelligence test. Such methods are only applicable to the measurement of human psychological properties. As a result, some researchers have proposed the idea of universal psychometrics - they suggest developing testing methods that allow for the measurement of non-human entities' psychological properties.

For example, it has been suggested that the Turing test is a form of universal psychometrics. This test involves having testers (without any foreknowledge) attempt to distinguish a human from a machine by interacting with both (while not being to see either individuals). It is supposed that if the machine is equally intelligent to a human, the testers will not be able to distinguish between the two, i.e., their guesses will not be better than chance. Thus, Turing test could measure the intelligence (a psychological variable) of an AI.

Other instruments proposed for universal psychometrics include reinforcement learning and measuring the ability to predict complexity.

== Articles ==
- Hernández-Orallo, J. (2015). Universal Psychometrics Tasks: difficulty, composition and decomposition. arXiv preprint arXiv:1503.07587.
- Hernández-Orallo, J. (2017). The Measure of All Minds. Evaluating Natural and Artificial Intelligence. Cambridge University Press.
