= Marcus Hutter =

German computer scientist (born 1967)

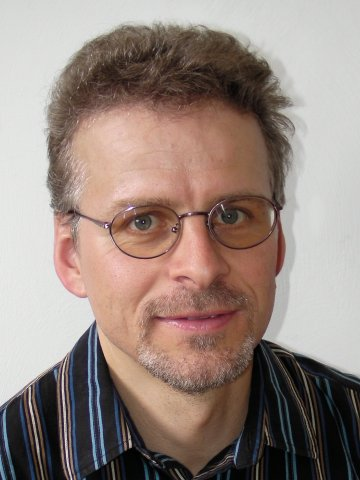
- Hutter in 2010
- Born: 14 April 1967 (age 59)
- Education: Technical University of Munich
- Known for: Universal artificial intelligence Artificial general intelligence
- Awards: IJCAI 2023; Alignment 2018; AGI 2016; UAI 2016; IJCAI-JAIR 2014; Kurzweil AGI 2009; Lindley 2006; Best Paper Prizes
- Scientific career
- Fields: Artificial intelligence; Bayesian statistics; Information theory; Particle physics
- Workplaces: DeepMind, Google, IDSIA, ANU, BrainLAB
- Thesis: Instantons in QCD (1996)
- Doctoral advisor: Harald Fritzsch
- Other academic advisors: Wilfried Brauer
- Doctoral students: Shane Legg, Jan Leike and Tor Lattimore
- Website: www.hutter1.net

Marcus Hutter (born 14 April 1967 in Munich) is a German computer scientist, professor and artificial intelligence researcher. As a senior researcher at DeepMind, he studies the mathematical foundations of artificial general intelligence.

Hutter studied physics and computer science at the Technical University of Munich. In 2000, he joined Jürgen Schmidhuber's group at the Dalle Molle Institute for Artificial Intelligence Research in Manno, Switzerland. He developed a mathematical formalism of artificial general intelligence named AIXI. He has served as a professor at the College of Engineering, Computing and Cybernetics of the Australian National University in Canberra, Australia.

== Research ==
Starting in 2000, Hutter developed and published a mathematical theory of artificial general intelligence, AIXI, based on idealised intelligent agents and reward-motivated reinforcement learning. His first book Universal Artificial Intelligence: Sequential Decisions Based on Algorithmic Probability was published in 2005 by Springer. Also in 2005, Hutter published with his doctoral student Shane Legg an intelligence test for artificial intelligence devices. In 2009, Hutter developed and published the theory of feature reinforcement learning. In 2014, Lattimore and Hutter published an asymptotically optimal extension of the AIXI agent.

An accessible podcast with Lex Fridman about his theory of Universal AI appeared in 2021 and a more technical follow-up with Tim Nguyen in 2024 in the Cartesian Cafe. His new (2024) book also gives a more accessible introduction to Universal AI and progress in the 20 years since his first book, including a chapter on ASI safety, which featured as a keynote at the inaugural workshop on AI safety in Sydney.

== Hutter Prize ==
In 2006, Hutter announced the Hutter Prize for Lossless Compression of Human Knowledge, with a total of €50,000 in prize money. In 2020, Hutter raised the prize money for the Hutter Prize to €500,000.

== See also ==
- Solomonoff induction

== Published works ==
- Hutter, Marcus (2002). "The Fastest and Shortest Algorithm for All Well-Defined Problems". International Journal of Foundations of Computer Science. 13 (3). World Scientific: 431–443. arXiv:cs/0206022. doi:10.1142/S0129054102001199. S2CID 5496821.
- — (2005). Universal Artificial Intelligence: Sequential Decisions Based on Algorithmic Probability. Springer. ISBN 978-3-540-22139-5. OCLC 828802143.
- Veness, Joel; Ng, Kee Siong; Hutter, Marcus; Uther, William; Silver, David (2011). "A Monte-Carlo AIXI Approximation". Journal of Artificial Intelligence Research. 40: 95–142. arXiv:0909.0801. doi:10.1613/jair.3125. S2CID 206618.
- Legg, Shane; Hutter, Marcus (2007). "Universal Intelligence: A Definition of Machine Intelligence". Minds and Machines. 17 (4): 391–444. arXiv:0712.3329. doi:10.1007/s11023-007-9079-x.
- Hutter, Marcus (2010). "A Complete Theory of Everything (will be subjective)". Algorithms. 3 (4): 329–350. arXiv:0912.5434. doi:10.3390/a3040329.
- Rathmanner, Samuel; Hutter, Marcus (2011). "A Philosophical Treatise of Universal Induction". Entropy. 13 (6): 1076–1136. arXiv:1105.5721. doi:10.3390/e13061076.
- Hutter, Marcus (2012). "Can Intelligence Explode?". Journal of Consciousness Studies. 19 (1–2): 143–166. arXiv:1202.6177.
- Sunehag, Peter; Hutter, Marcus (2015). "Rationality, Optimism and Guarantees in General Reinforcement Learning". Journal of Machine Learning Research. 16: 1345–90.
- Hutter, Reinhard; Hutter, Marcus (2021). "Chances and Risks of Artificial Intelligence – A Concept of Developing and Exploiting Machine Intelligence for Future Societies". Applied System Innovation. 4 (2): 37. doi:10.3390/asi4020037. hdl:1885/308753.
- Hutter, Marcus; Quarel, David; Catt, Elliot (2024). An Introduction to Universal Artificial Intelligence. Taylor & Francis. doi:10.1201/9781003460299. ISBN 978-1-032-60702-3. OCLC 1402822701.
