= Artificial general intelligence =

Type of hypothetical AI with wide-ranging abilities

Artificial general intelligence (AGI) is a hypothetical type of artificial intelligence that matches or surpasses human capabilities across most or all cognitive tasks. Unlike artificial narrow intelligence (ANI), whose competence is confined to well‑defined tasks, an AGI system can generalise knowledge, transfer skills between domains, and solve novel problems without task‑specific reprogramming.

Creating AGI is a stated goal of technology companies such as OpenAI, Google, SpaceXAI, and Meta. A 2020 survey identified 72 active AGI research and development projects across 37 countries.

AGI is a common topic in science fiction and futures studies.

Contention exists over whether AGI represents an existential risk. Some AI experts and industry figures have stated that mitigating the risk of human extinction posed by AGI should be a global priority. Others find the development of AGI to be in too remote a stage to present such a risk.

== Terminology ==
AGI is also known as general AI, strong AI, full AI, human-level AI, human-level intelligent AI, or general intelligent action.

The term "artificial general intelligence" was used in 1997 by Mark Gubrud in a discussion of the implications of fully automated military production and operations. A mathematical formalism of AGI named AIXI was proposed in 2000 by Marcus Hutter, who defines intelligence as "an agent's ability to achieve goals or succeed in a wide range of environments". This type of AGI has also been called "universal artificial intelligence". The term AGI was re-introduced and popularized by Shane Legg and Ben Goertzel around 2002.

Some academic sources reserve the term "strong AI" for computer programs that will experience sentience or consciousness. (Note: See below for the origin of the term "strong AI", and see the academic definition of "strong AI" and weak AI in the article Chinese room.) In contrast, weak AI (or narrow AI) can solve a specific problem but lacks general cognitive abilities. Some academic sources use "weak AI" to refer more broadly to any programs that neither experience consciousness nor have a mind in the same sense as humans.

Related concepts include artificial superintelligence and transformative AI. An artificial superintelligence (ASI) is a hypothetical type of AGI that is much more generally intelligent than humans, while the notion of transformative AI relates to AI having a large impact on society, for example, similar to the agricultural or industrial revolution.

A framework for classifying AGI was proposed in 2023 by Google DeepMind researchers. They define five performance levels of AGI: emerging, competent, expert, virtuoso, and superhuman. For example, a competent AGI is defined as an AI that outperforms 50% of skilled adults in a wide range of non-physical tasks, and a superhuman AGI (i.e., an artificial superintelligence) is similarly defined but with a threshold of 100%. They consider large language models like ChatGPT or LLaMA 2 to be instances of emerging AGI (comparable to unskilled humans). Regarding the autonomy of AGI and associated risks, they define five levels: tool (fully in human control), consultant, collaborator, expert, and agent (fully autonomous).

== Characteristics ==
There is no single agreed-upon definition of intelligence as applied to computers. Computer scientist John McCarthy wrote in 2007: "We cannot yet characterize in general what kinds of computational procedures we want to call intelligent."

=== Intelligence traits ===
Researchers generally hold that a system is required to do all of the following to be regarded as an AGI:

- reason, use strategy, solve puzzles, and make judgments under uncertainty,
- represent knowledge, including common sense knowledge,
- plan,
- learn,
- communicate in natural language,
- if necessary, integrate these skills in completion of any given goal.

Many interdisciplinary approaches (e.g. cognitive science, computational intelligence, and decision making) consider additional traits such as imagination (the ability to form novel mental images and concepts) and autonomy.

Computer-based systems exhibiting these capabilities are now widespread, with modern large language models demonstrating computational creativity, automated reasoning, and decision support simultaneously across domains.

=== Physical traits ===
Other capabilities are considered desirable in intelligent systems, as they may affect intelligence or aid in its expression. These include:

- the ability to sense (e.g. see, hear, etc.), and
- the ability to act (e.g. move and manipulate objects, change location to explore, etc.)

This includes the ability to detect and respond to hazard.

=== Tests for human-level AGI ===
The Turing test can provide some evidence of intelligence, but it penalizes non-human intelligent behavior and may incentivize artificial stupidity.

Several tests meant to confirm human-level AGI have been considered.

==== Turing test ====
The Turing test was proposed by Alan Turing in his 1950 paper "Computing Machinery and Intelligence". This test involves a human judge engaging in natural language conversations with both a human and a machine designed to generate human-like responses. The machine passes the test if it can convince the judge that it is human a significant fraction of the time. Turing proposed this as a practical measure of machine intelligence, focusing on the ability to produce human-like responses rather than on the internal workings of the machine.

The idea of the test is that the machine has to try and pretend to be a man, by answering questions put to it, and it will only pass if the pretence is reasonably convincing. A considerable portion of a jury, who should not be experts about machines, must be taken in by the pretence.

In 2014, a chatbot named Eugene Goostman, designed to imitate a 13-year-old Ukrainian boy, reportedly passed a Turing Test event by convincing 33% of judges that it was human. However, this claim was met with significant skepticism from the AI research community, who questioned the test's implementation and its relevance to AGI.

A 2025 pre‑registered, three‑party Turing‑test study by Cameron R. Jones and Benjamin K. Bergen showed that GPT-4.5 was judged to be the human in 73% of five‑minute text conversations—surpassing the 67% humanness rate of real confederates and meeting the researchers' criterion for having passed the test.

==== Ikea test ====
The "Ikea test", also known as the Flat Pack Furniture Test, involves an AI controlling a robot which attempts to assemble an Ikea flat-pack furniture product after having been shown the parts and instructions. As early as 2013, MIT's IkeaBot demonstrated fully autonomous multi-robot assembly of an IKEA Lack table in ten minutes, with no human intervention and no pre-programmed assembly instructions. The robots inferred the assembly sequence from the geometry of the parts alone.

==== Coffee test ====
Steve Wozniak proposed a test where a machine is required to enter an average American home and figure out how to make coffee. It must find the coffee machine, find the coffee, add water, find a mug, and brew the coffee by pushing the proper buttons. This test has been substantially approached across multiple systems. In January 2024, Figure AI's Figure 01 humanoid learned to operate a Keurig coffee machine autonomously after watching video demonstrations, using end-to-end neural networks to translate visual input into motor actions. In 2025, researchers at the University of Edinburgh published the ELLMER framework in Nature Machine Intelligence, demonstrating a robotic arm that interprets verbal instructions, analyses its surroundings, and autonomously makes coffee in dynamic kitchen environments — adapting to unforeseen obstacles in real time rather than following pre-programmed sequences.

==== Suleyman's test ====
Mustafa Suleyman's test proposes giving an AI model US$100,000 and asking it to obtain US$1 million.

==== Use of video games ====
Adams, et al. propose that the ability to learn and succeed in a wide range of video games can be used to test AI intelligence. This range would include games unknown to the AGI developers before the test is administered.

=== AI-complete problems ===
A problem is informally called "AI-complete" or "AI-hard" if it is believed that AGI would be needed to solve it, because the solution is beyond the capabilities of a purpose-specific algorithm.

== History ==
=== Classical AI ===
Modern AI research began in the mid-1950s. The first generation of AI researchers were convinced that artificial general intelligence was possible and that it would exist in just a few decades. AI pioneer Herbert A. Simon wrote in 1965: "machines will be capable, within twenty years, of doing any work a man can do".

Their predictions were the inspiration for Stanley Kubrick and Arthur C. Clarke's fictional character HAL 9000, who embodied what AI researchers believed they could create by the year 2001. AI pioneer Marvin Minsky was a consultant on the project of making HAL 9000 as realistic as possible according to the consensus predictions of the time. He said in 1967, "Within a generation... the problem of creating 'artificial intelligence' will substantially be solved".

Several classical AI projects, such as Douglas Lenat's Cyc project (that began in 1984), and Allen Newell's Soar project, were directed at AGI.

However, in the early 1970s, it became obvious that researchers had grossly underestimated the difficulty of the project. Funding agencies became skeptical of AGI and put researchers under increasing pressure to produce useful "applied AI". (Note: The Lighthill report specifically criticized AI's "grandiose objectives" and led the dismantling of AI research in England. In the U.S., DARPA became determined to fund only "mission-oriented direct research, rather than basic undirected research".) In the early 1980s, Japan's Fifth Generation Computer Project revived interest in AGI, setting out a ten-year timeline that included AGI goals like "carry on a casual conversation". In response to this and the success of expert systems, both industry and government pumped money into the field. However, confidence in AI spectacularly collapsed in the late 1980s, and the goals of the Fifth Generation Computer Project were never fulfilled. For the second time in 20 years, AI researchers who predicted the imminent achievement of AGI had been mistaken. By the 1990s, AI researchers had a reputation for making vain promises. They became reluctant to make predictions at all (Note: As AI founder John McCarthy writes "it would be a great relief to the rest of the workers in AI if the inventors of new general formalisms would express their hopes in a more guarded form than has sometimes been the case.") and avoided mention of "human level" artificial intelligence for fear of being labeled "wild-eyed dreamer[s]".

=== Narrow AI research ===
In the 1990s and early 21st century, mainstream AI achieved commercial success and academic respectability by focusing on specific sub-problems where AI can produce verifiable results and commercial applications, such as speech recognition and recommendation algorithms. These "applied AI" systems are now used extensively throughout the technology industry, and research in this vein is heavily funded in both academia and industry. As of 2018, development in this field was considered an emerging trend, and a mature stage was expected to be reached in more than 10 years.

At the turn of the century, many mainstream AI researchers hoped that strong AI could be developed by combining programs that solve various sub-problems. Hans Moravec wrote in 1988:

I am confident that this bottom-up route to artificial intelligence will one day meet the traditional top-down route more than halfway, ready to provide the real-world competence and the commonsense knowledge that has been so frustratingly elusive in reasoning programs. Fully intelligent machines will result when the metaphorical golden spike is driven, uniting the two efforts.

However, even at the time, this was disputed. For example, Stevan Harnad of Princeton University concluded his 1990 paper on the symbol grounding hypothesis by stating:

The expectation has often been voiced that "top-down" (symbolic) approaches to modeling cognition will somehow meet "bottom-up" (sensory) approaches somewhere in between. If the grounding considerations in this paper are valid, then this expectation is hopelessly modular and there is really only one viable route from sense to symbols: from the ground up. A free-floating symbolic level like the software level of a computer will never be reached by this route (or vice versa) – nor is it clear why we should even try to reach such a level, since it looks as if getting there would just amount to uprooting our symbols from their intrinsic meanings (thereby merely reducing ourselves to the functional equivalent of a programmable computer).

=== Feasibility ===
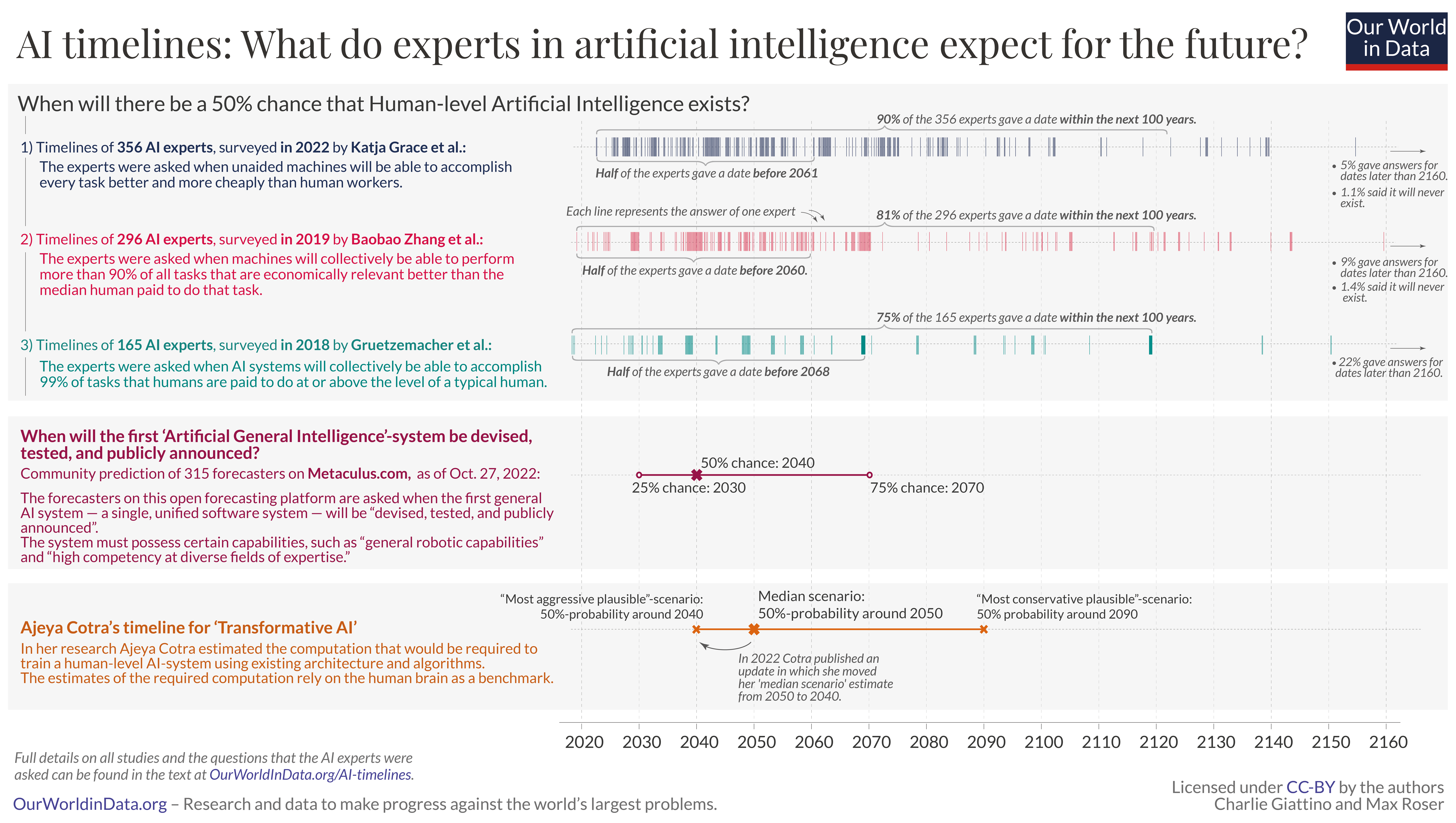
Surveys about when experts expect artificial general intelligence

As of 2023, the development and potential achievement of AGI remains a subject of intense debate within the AI community. While traditional consensus held that AGI was a distant goal, recent advancements have led some researchers and industry figures to claim that early forms of AGI may already exist. AI pioneer Herbert A. Simon speculated in 1965 that "machines will be capable, within twenty years, of doing any work a man can do". This prediction failed to come true. Microsoft co-founder Paul Allen believed that such intelligence is unlikely in the 21st century because it would require "unforeseeable and fundamentally unpredictable breakthroughs" and a "scientifically deep understanding of cognition". Writing in The Guardian, roboticist Alan Winfield claimed in 2014 that the gulf between modern computing and human-level artificial intelligence is as wide as the gulf between current space flight and practical faster-than-light spaceflight.

An additional challenge is the lack of clarity in defining what intelligence entails. Questions regarding consciousness, goal-setting, emotional capabilities, reasoning and brain replication remain contested within the broader research community, as does whether intelligence emerges as a consequence of scale.

Most AI researchers believe strong AI can be achieved in the future, but some thinkers, like Hubert Dreyfus and Roger Penrose, deny the possibility of achieving strong AI. John McCarthy is among those who believe human-level AI will be accomplished, but that the present level of progress is such that a date cannot accurately be predicted. AI experts' views on the feasibility of AGI wax and wane. Four polls conducted in 2012 and 2013 suggested that the median estimate among experts for when they would be 50% confident AGI would arrive was 2040 to 2050, depending on the poll, with the mean being 2081. Of the experts, 16.5% answered with "never" when asked the same question, but with a 90% confidence instead. Further current AGI progress considerations can be found above Tests for confirming human-level AGI.

A report by Stuart Armstrong and Kaj Sotala of the Machine Intelligence Research Institute found that "over [a] 60-year time frame there is a strong bias towards predicting the arrival of human-level AI as between 15 and 25 years from the time the prediction was made". They analyzed 95 predictions made between 1950 and 2012 on when human-level AI will come about.

In 2023, Microsoft researchers published a detailed evaluation of GPT-4. They concluded: "Given the breadth and depth of GPT-4's capabilities, we believe that it could reasonably be viewed as an early (yet still incomplete) version of an artificial general intelligence (AGI) system." Another study in 2023 reported that GPT-4 outperforms 99% of humans on the Torrance tests of creative thinking.

Blaise Agüera y Arcas and Peter Norvig wrote in 2023 the article "Artificial General Intelligence Is Already Here", arguing that frontier models had already achieved a significant level of general intelligence. They wrote that reluctance to this view comes from four main reasons: a "healthy skepticism about metrics for AGI", an "ideological commitment to alternative AI theories or techniques", a "devotion to human (or biological) exceptionalism", or a "concern about the economic implications of AGI".

=== Timescales ===
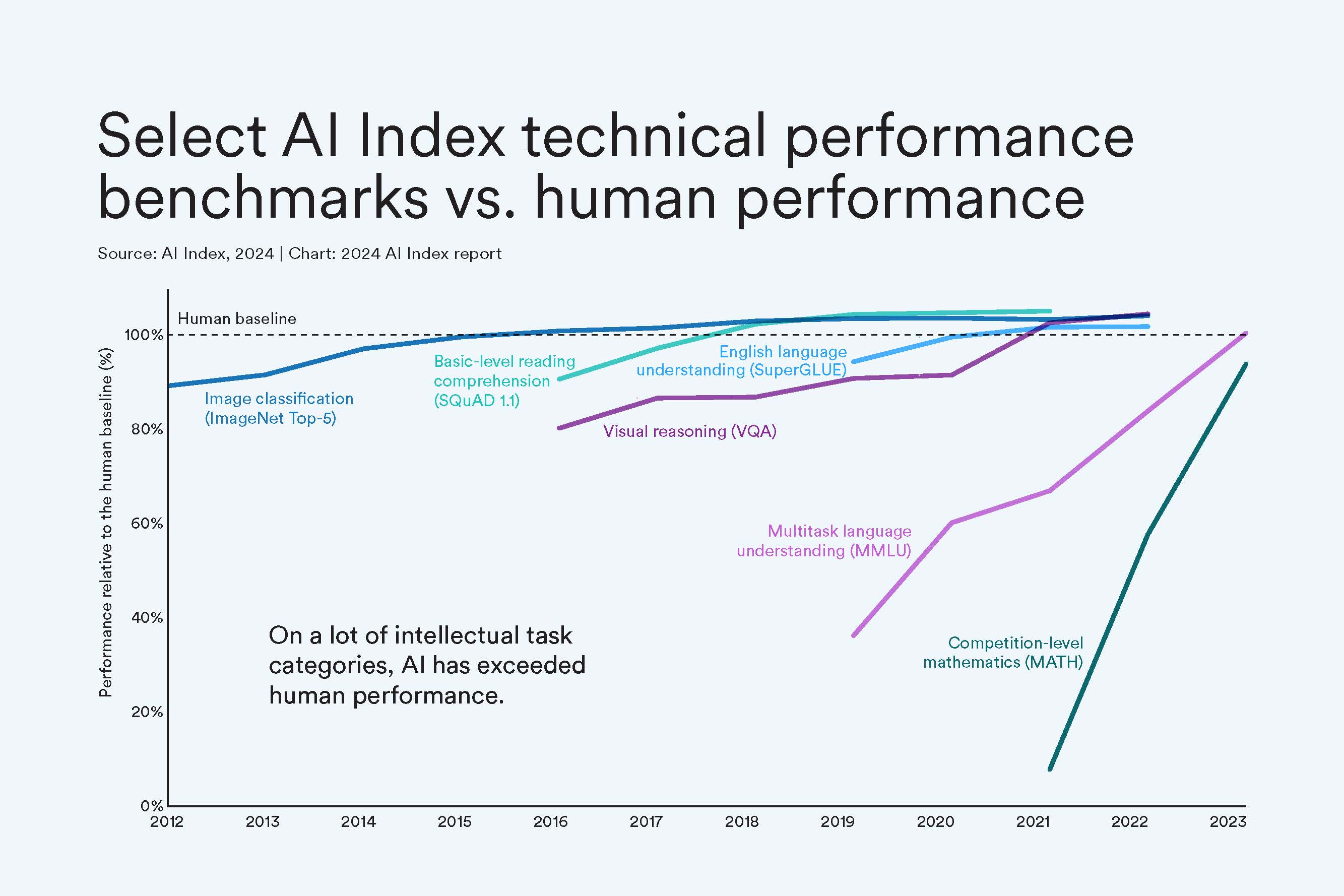
AI has surpassed humans on a variety of language understanding and visual understanding benchmarks. As of 2023, foundation models still lack advanced reasoning and planning capabilities, but rapid progress is expected.

Progress in artificial intelligence has historically gone through periods of rapid progress separated by periods when progress appeared to stop. Ending each hiatus were fundamental advances in hardware, software or both to create space for further progress. For example, the computer hardware available in the twentieth century was not sufficient to implement deep learning, which requires large numbers of GPU-enabled CPUs.

In the introduction to his 2006 book, Goertzel says that estimates of the time needed before a truly flexible AGI is built vary from 10 years to over a century. As of 2007, the consensus in the AGI research community seemed to be that the timeline discussed by Ray Kurzweil in 2005 in The Singularity is Near (i.e. between 2015 and 2045) was plausible. Mainstream AI researchers have given a wide range of opinions on whether progress will be this rapid. A 2012 meta-analysis of 95 such opinions found a bias towards predicting that the onset of AGI would occur within 16–26 years for modern and historical predictions alike. That paper has been criticized for how it categorized opinions as expert or non-expert.

In 2012, Alex Krizhevsky, Ilya Sutskever, and Geoffrey Hinton developed a neural network called AlexNet, which won the ImageNet competition with a top-5 test error rate of 15.3%, significantly better than the second-best entry's rate of 26.3% (the traditional approach used a weighted sum of scores from different pre-defined classifiers). AlexNet was regarded as the initial ground-breaker of the current deep learning wave.

In 2017, researchers Feng Liu, Yong Shi, and Ying Liu conducted intelligence tests on publicly available and freely accessible weak AI such as Google AI, Apple's Siri, and others. At the maximum, these AIs reached an IQ value of about 47, which corresponds approximately to a six-year-old child in first grade. An adult comes to about 100 on average. Similar tests were carried out in 2014, with the IQ score reaching a maximum value of 27.

In 2020, OpenAI developed GPT-3, a language model capable of performing many diverse tasks without specific training. According to Gary Grossman in a VentureBeat article, while there is consensus that GPT-3 is not an example of AGI, it is considered by some to be too advanced to be classified as a narrow AI system.

In the same year, Jason Rohrer used his GPT-3 account to develop a chatbot, and provided a chatbot-developing platform called "Project December". OpenAI asked for changes to the chatbot to comply with their safety guidelines; Rohrer disconnected Project December from the GPT-3 API.

In 2022, DeepMind developed Gato, a "general-purpose" system capable of performing more than 600 different tasks.

In 2023, AI researcher Geoffrey Hinton stated that:

The idea that this stuff could actually get smarter than people – a few people believed that, [...]. But most people thought it was way off. And I thought it was way off. I thought it was 30 to 50 years or even longer away. Obviously, I no longer think that.

He estimated in 2024 (with low confidence) that systems smarter than humans could appear within 5 to 20 years and stressed the attendant existential risks.

In May 2023, Demis Hassabis similarly said that "The progress in the last few years has been pretty incredible", and that he sees no reason why it would slow, expecting AGI within a decade or even a few years. In March 2024, Nvidia's Chief Executive Officer (CEO), Jensen Huang, stated his expectation that within five years, AI would be capable of passing any test at least as well as humans. In June 2024, the AI researcher Leopold Aschenbrenner, a former OpenAI employee, estimated AGI by 2027 to be "strikingly plausible".

In September 2025, a review of surveys of scientists and industry experts from the last 15 years reported that most agreed that artificial general intelligence (AGI) will occur before the year 2100. A more recent analysis by AIMultiple reported that, "Current surveys of AI researchers are predicting AGI around 2040".

OpenAI CEO Sam Altman said in December 2025 that "we built AGIs" and that "AGI kinda went whooshing by" with less societal impact than expected, proposing the field move on to defining superintelligence. In 2026, OpenAI's president Greg Brockman claimed that the company's model GPT-6 Astra marked the beginning of the "AGI era".

== Whole brain emulation ==
While the development of transformer models like in ChatGPT is considered the most promising path to AGI, whole brain emulation can serve as an alternative approach. With whole brain simulation, a brain model is built by scanning and mapping a biological brain in detail, and then copying and simulating it on a computer system or another computational device. The simulation model must be sufficiently faithful to the original, so that it behaves in practically the same way as the original brain. Whole brain emulation is a type of brain simulation that is discussed in computational neuroscience and neuroinformatics, and for medical research purposes. It has been discussed in artificial intelligence research as an approach to strong AI. Neuroimaging technologies that could deliver the necessary detailed understanding are improving rapidly, and futurist Ray Kurzweil in the book The Singularity Is Near predicts that a map of sufficient quality will become available on a similar timescale to the computing power required to emulate it.

=== Early estimates ===
Estimates of how much processing power is needed to emulate a human brain at various levels (from Ray Kurzweil, Anders Sandberg and Nick Bostrom), along with the fastest supercomputer from TOP500 mapped by year. Note the logarithmic scale and exponential trendline, which assumes the computational capacity doubles every 1.2 years. Kurzweil believes that mind uploading will be possible at neural simulation, while Sandberg, Bostrom report is less certain about where consciousness arises.

For low-level brain simulation, a very powerful cluster of computers or GPUs would be required, given the enormous quantity of synapses within the human brain. Each of the 10^{11} (one hundred billion) neurons has on average 7,000 synaptic connections (synapses) to other neurons. The brain of a three-year-old child has about 10^{15} synapses (1 quadrillion). This number declines with age, stabilizing by adulthood. Estimates vary for an adult, ranging from 10^{14} to 5×10^{14} synapses (100 to 500 trillion). An estimate of the brain's processing power, based on a simple switch model for neuron activity, is around 10^{14} (100 trillion) synaptic updates per second (SUPS).

In 1997, Kurzweil looked at various estimates for the hardware required to equal the human brain and adopted a figure of 10^{16} computations per second. (Note: In "Mind Children" 10^{15} cps is used. More recently, in 1997, Moravec argued for 10^{8} MIPS which would roughly correspond to 10^{14} cps. Moravec talks in terms of MIPS, not "cps", which is a non-standard term Kurzweil introduced.) (For comparison, if a "computation" was equivalent to one "floating-point operation" – a measure used to rate current supercomputers – then 10^{16} "computations" would be equivalent to 10 petaFLOPS, achieved in 2011, while 10^{18} was achieved in 2022.) He used this figure to predict that the necessary hardware would be available sometime between 2015 and 2025, if the exponential growth in computer power at the time of writing continued.

=== Current research ===
The Human Brain Project, an EU-funded initiative active from 2013 to 2023, has developed a particularly detailed and publicly accessible atlas of the human brain. In 2023, researchers from Duke University performed a high-resolution scan of a mouse brain.

=== Criticisms of simulation-based approaches ===
The artificial neuron model assumed by Kurzweil and used in many current artificial neural network implementations is simple compared with biological neurons. A brain simulation would likely have to capture the detailed cellular behaviour of biological neurons, presently understood only in broad outline. The overhead introduced by full modeling of the biological, chemical, and physical details of neural behaviour (especially on a molecular scale) would require computational powers several orders of magnitude larger than Kurzweil's estimate. In addition, the estimates do not account for glial cells, which are known to play a role in cognitive processes.

A fundamental criticism of the simulated brain approach derives from embodied cognition theory, which asserts that human embodiment is an essential aspect of human intelligence and is necessary to ground meaning. If this theory is correct, any fully functional brain model will need to encompass more than just the neurons (e.g., a robotic body). Goertzel proposes virtual embodiment (like in metaverses like Second Life) as an option, but it is unknown whether this would be sufficient.

== Philosophical perspective ==
=== "Strong AI" as defined in philosophy ===
In 1980, philosopher John Searle coined the term "strong AI" as part of his Chinese room argument. He proposed a distinction between two hypotheses about artificial intelligence: (Note: As defined in a standard AI textbook: "The assertion that machines could act intelligently (or, perhaps better, act as if they were intelligent) is called the 'weak AI' hypothesis by philosophers, and the assertion that machines that do so are actually thinking (as opposed to simulating thinking) is called the 'strong AI' hypothesis.")

- Strong AI hypothesis: An artificial intelligence system can have "a mind" and "consciousness".
- Weak AI hypothesis: An artificial intelligence system can (only) act like it thinks and has a mind and consciousness.

The first one he called "strong" because it makes a stronger statement: it assumes something special has happened to the machine that goes beyond those abilities that we can test. The behaviour of a "weak AI" machine would be identical to a "strong AI" machine, but the latter would also have subjective conscious experience. This usage is also common in academic AI research and textbooks.

In contrast to Searle and mainstream AI, some futurists such as Ray Kurzweil use the term "strong AI" to mean "human level artificial general intelligence". This is not the same as Searle's strong AI, unless it is assumed that consciousness is necessary for human-level AGI. Academic philosophers such as Searle do not believe that is the case, and to most artificial intelligence researchers, the question is out of scope.

Mainstream AI is most interested in how a program behaves. According to Russell and Norvig, "as long as the program works, they don't care if you call it real or a simulation." If the program can behave as if it has a mind, then there is no need to know if it actually has a mind – indeed, there would be no way to tell. For AI research, Searle's "weak AI hypothesis" is equivalent to the statement "artificial general intelligence is possible". Thus, according to Russell and Norvig, "most AI researchers take the weak AI hypothesis for granted, and don't care about the strong AI hypothesis." Thus, for academic AI research, "Strong AI" and "AGI" are two different things.

=== Consciousness ===
Consciousness can have various meanings, and some aspects play significant roles in science fiction and the ethics of artificial intelligence:

- Sentience (or "phenomenal consciousness"): The ability to "feel" perceptions or emotions subjectively, as opposed to the ability to reason about perceptions. Some philosophers, such as David Chalmers, use the term "consciousness" to refer exclusively to phenomenal consciousness, which is roughly equivalent to sentience. Determining why and how subjective experience arises is known as the hard problem of consciousness. Thomas Nagel explained in 1974 that it "feels like" something to be conscious. If we are not conscious, then it does not feel like anything. Nagel uses the example of a bat: we can sensibly ask "what does it feel like to be a bat?" However, we are unlikely to ask "what does it feel like to be a toaster?" Nagel concludes that a bat appears to be conscious (i.e., has consciousness) but a toaster does not. In 2022, a Google engineer claimed that the company's AI chatbot, LaMDA, had achieved sentience, though this claim was widely disputed by other experts.
- Self-awareness: To have conscious awareness of oneself as a separate individual, especially to be consciously aware of one's own thoughts. This is opposed to simply being the "subject of one's thought"—an operating system or debugger can be "aware of itself" (that is, to represent itself in the same way it represents everything else)—but this is not what people typically mean when they use the term "self-awareness". (Note: Alan Turing made this point in 1950.) In some advanced AI models, systems construct internal representations of their own cognitive processes and feedback patterns—occasionally referring to themselves using second-person constructs such as 'you' within self-modeling frameworks.

These traits have a moral dimension. AI sentience would give rise to concerns of welfare and legal protection, similarly to animals. Other aspects of consciousness related to cognitive capabilities are also relevant to the concept of AI rights. Figuring out how to integrate advanced AI with existing legal and social frameworks is an emergent issue.

== Hypothetical benefits ==
AGI could improve productivity and efficiency in most jobs. It could take care of the elderly, and democratize access to rapid, high-quality medical diagnostics. It could offer fun, inexpensive and personalized education. The need to work to subsist could become obsolete if the wealth produced is properly redistributed. This also raises the question of the place of humans in a radically automated society.

AGI could also help to make rational decisions, and to anticipate and prevent disasters. It could also help to reap the benefits of potentially catastrophic technologies such as nanotechnology or climate engineering, while avoiding the associated risks. If an AGI's primary goal is to prevent existential catastrophes such as human extinction (which could be difficult if the Vulnerable World Hypothesis turns out to be true), it could take measures to drastically reduce the risks while minimizing the impact of these measures on humanity's quality of life.

== Risks ==
=== Existential risks ===
AGI may represent multiple types of existential risk, which are risks that threaten "the premature extinction of Earth-originating intelligent life or the permanent and drastic destruction of its potential for desirable future development". The risk of human extinction from AGI has been the topic of many debates, but there is also the possibility that the development of AGI would lead to a permanently flawed future. Notably, it could be used to spread and preserve the set of values of whoever develops it. If humanity still has moral blind spots similar to slavery in the past, AGI might irreversibly entrench them, preventing moral progress. Furthermore, AGI could facilitate mass surveillance and indoctrination, which could be used to create an entrenched repressive worldwide totalitarian regime. There is also a risk for the machines themselves. If machines that are sentient or otherwise worthy of moral consideration are mass-created in the future, engaging in a civilizational path that indefinitely neglects their welfare and interests could be an existential catastrophe. Considering how much AGI could improve humanity's future and help reduce other existential risks, Toby Ord calls these existential risks "an argument for proceeding with due caution", not for "abandoning AI".

==== Risk of loss of control and human extinction ====
The thesis that AI poses an existential risk for humans, and that this risk needs more attention, is controversial but has been endorsed in 2023 by many public figures, AI researchers and CEOs of AI companies such as Elon Musk, Bill Gates, Geoffrey Hinton, Yoshua Bengio, Demis Hassabis and Sam Altman.

In 2014, Stephen Hawking criticized widespread indifference:

So, facing possible futures of incalculable benefits and risks, the experts are surely doing everything possible to ensure the best outcome, right? Wrong. If a superior alien civilisation sent us a message saying, 'We'll arrive in a few decades,' would we just reply, 'OK, call us when you get here—we'll leave the lights on?' Probably not—but this is more or less what is happening with AI.

The potential fate of humanity has sometimes been compared to the fate of gorillas threatened by human activities. The comparison states that greater intelligence allowed humanity to dominate gorillas, which are now vulnerable in ways that they could not have anticipated. As a result, the gorilla has become an endangered species, not out of malice, but simply as collateral damage from human activities.

The skeptic Yann LeCun considers that AGIs will have no desire to dominate humanity and that we should be careful not to anthropomorphize them and interpret their intentions as we would for humans. He said that people will not be "smart enough to design super-intelligent machines, yet ridiculously stupid to the point of giving it moronic objectives with no safeguards". On the other side, the concept of instrumental convergence suggests that almost whatever their goals, intelligent agents will have reasons to try to survive and acquire more power as intermediary steps to achieving these goals. And that this does not require having emotions.

Many scholars who are concerned about existential risk advocate for more research into solving the "control problem" to answer the question: what types of safeguards, algorithms, or architectures can programmers implement to maximise the probability that their recursively-improving AI would continue to behave in a friendly, rather than destructive, manner after it reaches superintelligence? Solving the control problem is complicated by the AI arms race (which could lead to a race to the bottom of safety precautions in order to release products before competitors), and the use of AI in weapon systems.

The thesis that AI can pose existential risk also has critics. Skeptics usually say that AGI is unlikely in the short term, or that concerns about AGI distract from other issues related to current AI. Former Google fraud czar Shuman Ghosemajumder considers that for many people outside of the technology industry, existing chatbots and LLMs are already perceived as though they were AGI, leading to further misunderstanding and fear.

Some researchers, including Google Brain co-founder Andrew Ng, have said that the communication campaigns about the supposed existential risks of AI pushed by certain AI companies (such as OpenAI, Anthropic, DeepMind, and Conjecture) may be an at attempt at creating regulatory capture and to inflate interest in their products.

In 2023, the CEOs of Google DeepMind, OpenAI and Anthropic, along with other industry leaders and researchers, issued a joint statement asserting that "Mitigating the risk of extinction from AI should be a global priority alongside other societal-scale risks such as pandemics and nuclear war."

=== Mass unemployment ===
Researchers from OpenAI estimated in 2023 that "80% of the U.S. workforce could have at least 10% of their work tasks affected by the introduction of LLMs, while around 19% of workers may see at least 50% of their tasks impacted". They consider office workers to be the most exposed, for example mathematicians, accountants or web designers. AGI could have a better autonomy, ability to make decisions, to interface with other computer tools, but also to control robotized bodies. A common belief among top AI company insiders is that most workers will face technological unemployment from AGI, starting with white-collar jobs and, as robotics improves, extending to blue-collar jobs. Critics of the idea argue that AGI will complement rather than replace humans, and that automation displaces work in the short term but not in the long term.

According to Stephen Hawking, the outcome of automation on the quality of life will depend on how the wealth will be redistributed:

Everyone can enjoy a life of luxurious leisure if the machine-produced wealth is shared, or most people can end up miserably poor if the machine-owners successfully lobby against wealth redistribution. So far, the trend seems to be toward the second option, with technology driving ever-increasing inequality

Elon Musk argued in 2021 that the automation of society will require governments to adopt a universal basic income (UBI). Hinton similarly advised the UK government in 2025 to adopt a UBI as a response to AI-induced unemployment. In 2023, Hinton said "I'm a socialist [...] I think that private ownership of the media, and of the 'means of computation', is not good."

== See also ==
- AI alignment – Conformance of AI to intended objectives
- AI effect – Phenomenon in which AI achievements are reclassified as non-intelligent
- Artificial brain – Emulation of animal or human brain
- Automated machine learning – Process of automating the application of machine learning
- BRAIN Initiative – Public-private research initiative
- China Brain Project – Chinese neuroscience program
- Future of Humanity Institute – 2005–2024 Oxford University research centre
- General game playing – Ability of artificial intelligence to play different games
- Generative AI – AI that generates content
- Hardware for artificial intelligence – Hardware specially designed and optimized for artificial intelligence
- Human Brain Project – Scientific research project
- Intelligence amplification – Use of information technology to augment human intelligence (IA)
- Loebner Prize – Annual AI competition
- Machine ethics – Moral behaviours of man-made machines
- Moravec's paradox – Observation that perception requires more computation than reasoning
- Multi-task learning – Solving multiple machine learning tasks at the same time
- Neural scaling law – Statistical law in machine learning
- Outline of artificial intelligence
- Superintelligence ban – Proposed restrictions on developing artificial superintelligence
- Synthetic intelligence – Alternative term for artificial intelligence
- Technological Singularity – Hypothetical event
- The Future of Work and Death
- Transfer learning – Machine learning technique
- Transhumanism – Philosophical movement
- Universal psychometrics – Psychometrics for any intelligent agent
- Weak artificial intelligence – Form of artificial intelligence
