= InstaDeep =

Tunisian artificial intelligence company

InstaDeep is a Tunisian startup specializing in artificial intelligence, founded in 2014 by Karim Beguir and Zohra Slim. It is based in London and is a subsidiary of BioNTech.

The company is particularly known for developing an early warning system for detecting COVID-19 variants.

== History ==
InstaDeep was founded in 2014 by Karim Beguir, a polytechnic engineer with a degree in applied mathematics from New York University, and Zohra Slim, a technology enthusiast and former director of a digital communication agency. The company focuses on developing artificial intelligence driven solutions. In 2019, InstaDeep raised $7 million in a Series A funding round from AfricInvest and Effort Catalyseur.

As of 2024 the company had offices in London, Paris, Tunis, Lagos, Dubai, Berlin, Boston, Cape Town, San Francisco, and Kigali. In April 2021, InstaDeep became an official NVIDIA supplier, recognized for its expertise in GPU-based AI solutions. In August 2022, in partnership with Google and the Tunisian Ministry of Industry, InstaDeep organized "AI Hack Tunisia", the largest artificial intelligence and machine learning hackathon in the MENA region. In January 2023, BioNTech acquired InstaDeep for €636 million.

In September 2023, InstaDeep and Gomycode launched an artificial intelligence school in Tataouine, Tunisia, aimed at training young professionals in AI technologies. On June 18, 2024, InstaDeep and Syngenta announced a collaboration in the agricultural sector. In September 2024, in partnership with Google, InstaDeep launched a new version of its chip design platform.

== Partnerships ==
InstaDeep collaborates with several leading companies and research institutions, including Google DeepMind, Nvidia, and the University of Oxford, to develop advanced artificial intelligence solutions.
