= Wilfried Brauer =

German computer scientist (1937–2014)

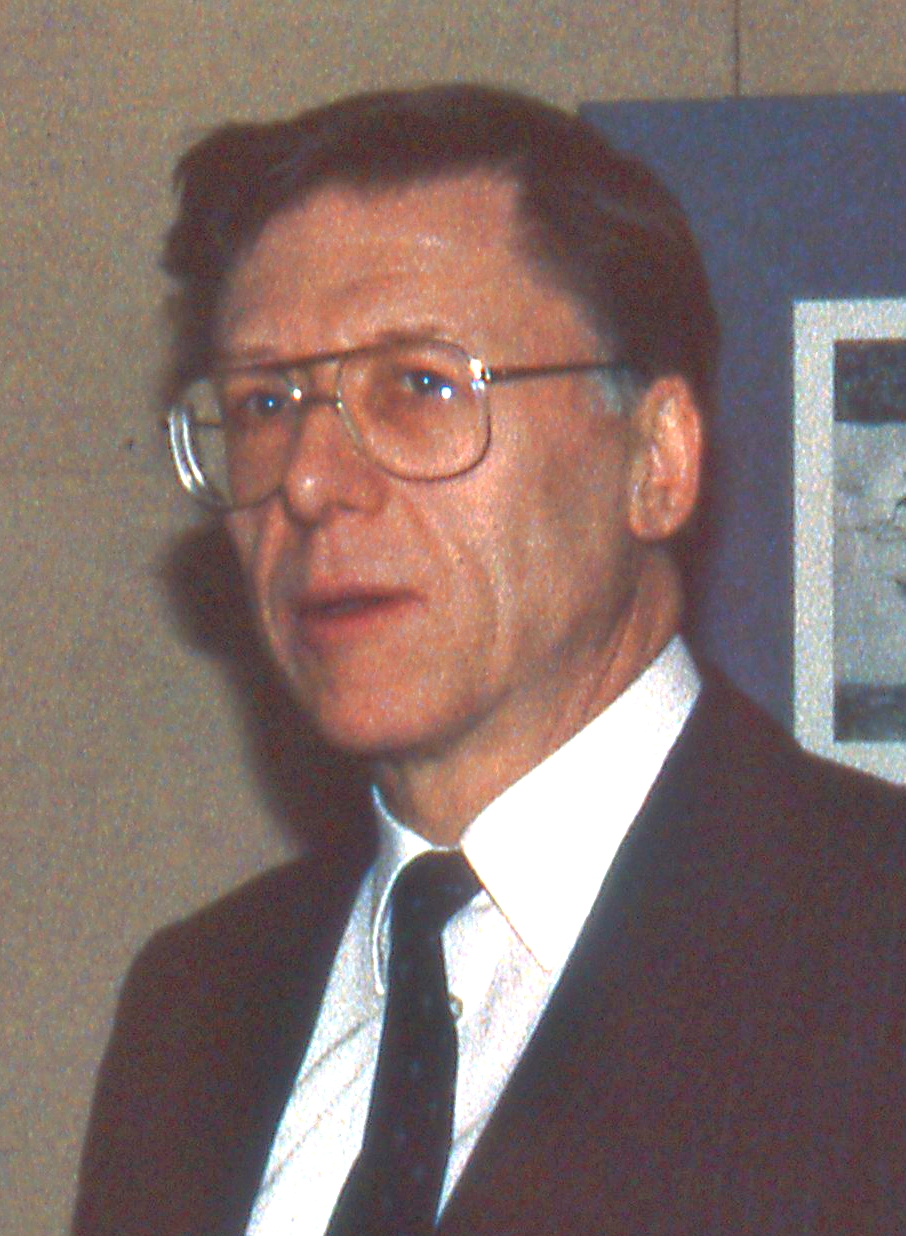
- Brauer in 1995
- Born: 8 August 1937; Berlin, Prussia
- Died: 25 February 2014 (aged 76); Bonn, North Rhine-Westphalia
- Education: University of Bonn
- Scientific career
- Fields: Computer science
- Workplaces: Technical University of Munich
- Thesis: Zur Theorie der pro-endlichen Gruppen (1966)
- Doctoral advisor: Wolfgang Krull
- Doctoral students: Sepp Hochreiter; Jürgen Schmidhuber; Wolfgang Wahlster

Wilfried Brauer (8 August 1937 – 25 February 2014) was a German computer scientist and professor emeritus at Technical University of Munich.

== Life and work ==
Brauer studied Mathematics, Physics, and Philosophy at the Free University of Berlin. He received a PhD in Mathematics 1966 from the University of Bonn for a dissertation on the theory of profinite groups.

Wilfried Brauer and his wife Ute were two of the 19 founding members of the German Informatics Society. From 1998 to 2001, he was chairman of the German Informatics Society. From 1994 to 1999, he was vice president of the International Federation of Information Processing.

He received several awards and honours:

- Felix Hausdorff-Gedächtnispreis (1966)
- IFIP Silver Core (1986)
- honorary doctor of the University of Hamburg (1996)
- Werner Heisenberg Medal (2000)
- IFIP Isaac L. Auerbach Award (2002)
- honorary doctor of the Freie Universität Berlin (2004)
- One of ten inaugural fellows of the European Association for Theoretical Computer Science (2014, posthumous).

== Publications ==
Below is a selection of books written by Brauer.

- Über das Turingsche Modell einer Rechenmaschine und den Begriff des Algorithmus, Diploma Thesis, Freie Universität Berlin, 1962
- Zur Theorie der pro-endlichen Gruppen. Doctorate Thesis, Universität Bonn, 1968 (Advisor: Wolfgang Krull)
- with Klaus Indermark: Algorithmen, Rekursive Funktionen und Formale Sprachen (in German), 1968.
- Automatentheorie (in German), Teubner 1984.
- with Friedrich L. Bauer and H. Schwichtenberg: Logic and Algebra of Specifications, 1993

Editorship

- Wilfried Brauer (ed.): Gesellschaft für Informatik e.V., 3. Jahrestagung, Hamburg, 8.-10. Oktober 1973. Lecture Notes in Computer Science Volume 1, Springer 1973
- Texts in Theoretical Computer Science. An EATCS Series. Series Editors: Brauer, W., Hromkovič, J., Rozenberg, G., Salomaa, A., publisher's page.
