= Speed prior =

The speed prior is a complexity measure similar to Kolmogorov complexity, except that it is based on computation speed as well as program length. The speed prior complexity of a program is its size in bits plus the logarithm of the maximum time we are willing to run it to get a prediction.

When compared to traditional measures, use of the Speed. Prior has the disadvantage of leading to less optimal predictions, and the advantage of providing computable predictions.

== See also ==
- Computational complexity theory
- Inductive inference
- Minimum message length
- Minimum description length
