= Arff =

Arff or ARFF may refer to:

- Aircraft Rescue and Firefighting (ARFF)
- Attribute-Relation File Format (ARFF), an input file format used by the machine learning tool Weka (machine learning)
