= Marius Lindauer =

German computer scientist

- Born: December 25, 1985 (age 40); Berlin, Germany
- Education: University of Potsdam
- Scientific career
- Fields: Artificial intelligence
- Workplaces: Leibniz University Hannover
- Doctoral advisor: Torsten Schaub and Holger Hoos

Marius Lindauer (born December 25, 1985, in Berlin, Germany) is a German computer scientist and professor of machine learning at the institute of artificial intelligence of the Leibniz University Hannover. He is known for his research on Automated Machine Learning and other meta-algorithmic approaches.

== Life ==
Marius Lindauer studied computer science at the University of Potsdam from 2005 to 2010. Under the supervision of Torsten Schaub and Holger Hoos, he received his Dr. rer. nat. at the University of Potsdam in 2015. In 2014, he joined the Machine Learning research lab led by Frank Hutter as the first postdoctoral researcher and helped to build up the group. He then joined the Leibniz University Hannover as a professor in 2019 to lead the Machine learning research lab. He founded the Institute of Artificial Intelligence at the Leibniz University Hannover in 2022. Additionally, he is the co-head of the automl.org research group, automl.space community effort, and co-founder of the COSEAL research network, where he currently serves as an advisory board member. He is also a supporting member of CLAIRE, and a member of ELLIS. His research is published in renowned journals and conferences.

== Achievements ==
During his Ph.D., Marius won several international competitions in the fields of solving hard combinatorial optimization problems, including 1st place in the NP-track of the answer set programming competition 2011 with claspfolio, the Hard Combinatorial SAT+UNSAT of the SAT challenge 2012 with clasp-crafted and two tracks of the configurable SAT solver challenge 2013 with clasp-cssc. During his PostDoc and later on, he was involved in winning tracks of the first and second AutoML challenge with auto-sklearn and the black-box optimization challenge for machine learning at NeurIPS'20.

== Research Directions ==
Marius has delved into many research topics, all of which are unified under the umbrella of automating parts of the Machine Learning pipeline. His research touches many different aspects:

- Hyperparameter Optimization
- Multi-Fidelity Optimization
- Automated Reinforcement Learning
- Interactive AutoML
- Green AutoML
- Explainable AutoML
