= Trojan:Win32/Agent =

Type of malware

A Trojan:Win32/Agent is the definition (from Microsoft or Apple) of a Trojan downloader, Trojan dropper, or Trojan spy. Its first known detection was January 2018, according to Microsoft Malware Protection Center. Trojans may allow an attacker to access users' personal information such as banking information, passwords, or personal identity. It can also delete a user's files or infect other devices connected to the network. It can be removed by a virus scanning and removal tool such as Microsoft Defender.

== Additional info ==
Win32/Agent Trojans have been observed to perform any, or all, of the following actions:

- Redirecting web traffic to malicious/compromised websites/domains
- Manipulating certain Windows or other installed applications, including the specific settings and/or configurations
- Dropping and/or installing additional malicious scripts or programs as well downloading and starting separate malicious programs

== Other aliases ==
- Trojan.Win32.Agent (Kaspersky Labs)
- Trojan:Generic.dx!tus (McAfee)
