= Yoav Shoham =

American computer scientist

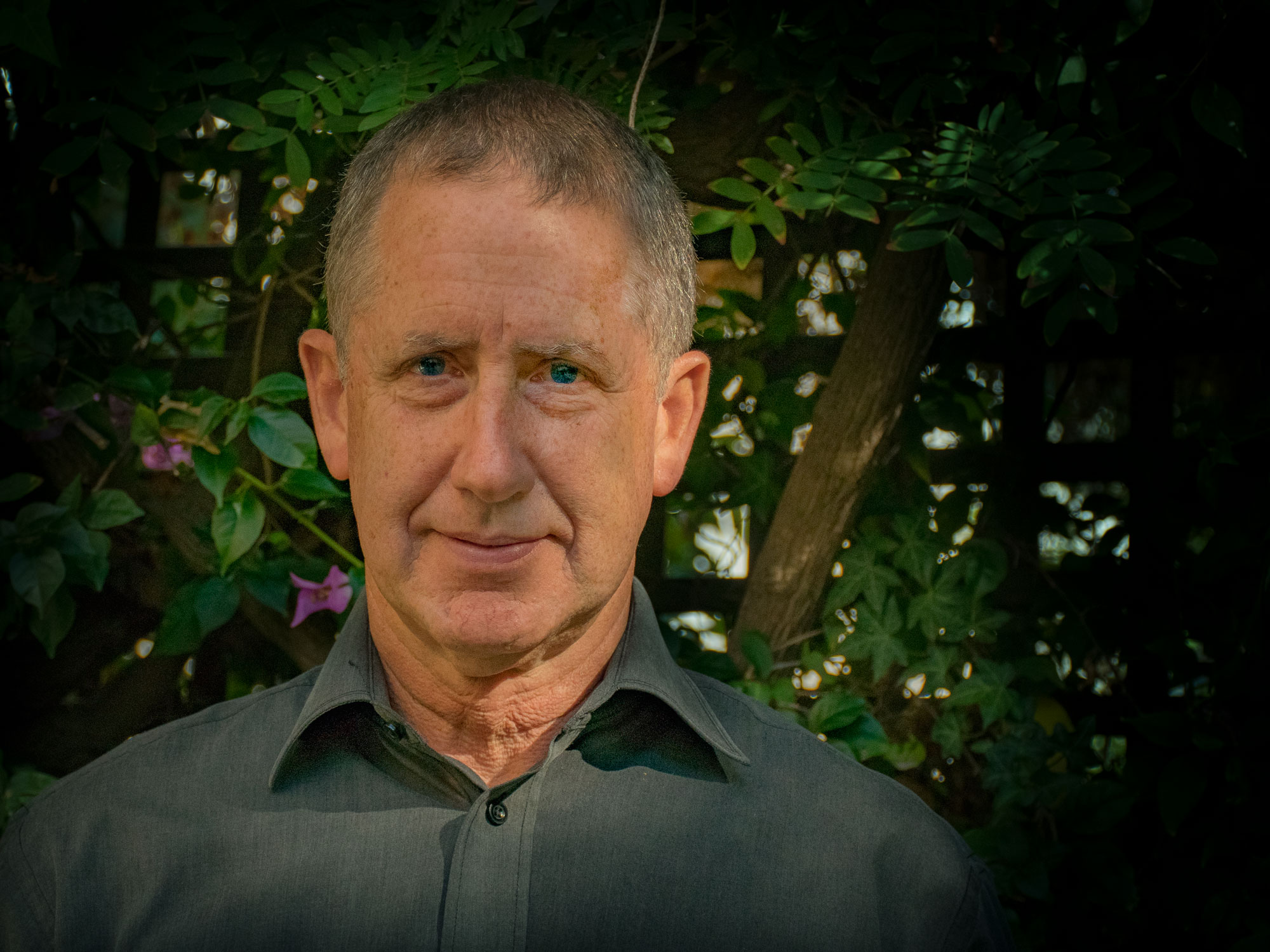
- Born: 22 January 1956 (age 70); Israel
- Education: Technion – Israel Institute of Technology, Yale University
- Awards: Allen Newell Award (2012); AAAI Feigenbaum Prize (2017); IJCAI Research Excellence Award (2019)
- Scientific career
- Fields: Computer Science
- Workplaces: Stanford University
- Doctoral advisor: Drew McDermott
- Doctoral students: Kevin Leyton-Brown

Yoav Shoham (Hebrew: יואב שוהם; born 22 January 1956) is a computer scientist and a professor emeritus at Stanford University. His research spans artificial intelligence, logic and game theory. He has also founded and sold several AI companies.

Shoham received his B.Sc. from Technion – Israel Institute of Technology, and his Ph.D. at Yale University in 1987.

Shoham is a Fellow of the Association for the Advancement of Artificial Intelligence (AAAI), of the Association for Computing Machinery (ACM), and of the Game Theory Society (GTS). Among his awards are the 2008 ACM/SIGART Autonomous Agents Research Award, the 2012 ACM - AAAI Allen Newell Award, and the 2019 IJCAI Research Excellence Award.

Shoham co-teaches two popular game theory courses on Coursera.org, along with Matthew O. Jackson and Kevin Leyton-Brown, viewed by over half a million people.

Shoham initiated the AI Index, a project to track activity and progress in AI, which was launched publicly at the end of 2017.

A serial entrepreneur, in 1999 Shoham founded TradingDynamics which was sold to Ariba in 2000. In 2011 he co-founded Katango which was sold to Google in 2013. In 2014 he co-founded Timeful which was sold to Google in 2015. Following that acquisition, Shoham joined Google as principal scientist where he worked until August 2017. He later that year co-founded AI21 Labs, an AI platform company.

== Selected publications ==
- Shoham, Yoav; Leyton-Brown, Kevin (2009). Multiagent Systems: Algorithmic, Game-Theoretic, and Logical Foundations. Cambridge University Press. p. 496. ISBN 978-0-521-89943-7.
- Leyton-Brown, Kevin; Shoham, Yoav (2008). Essentials of Game Theory: A Concise, Multidisciplinary Introduction. San Rafael, CA: Morgan & Claypool Publishers. ISBN 978-1-59829-593-1.
- Shoham, Yoav (1994). Artificial Intelligence Techniques in Prolog. Morgan Kaufmann Publishers.
- Shoham, Yoav (1988). Reasoning about Change: Time and Causation from the Standpoint of Artificial Intelligence. MIT Press.
