= Carlos Guestrin =

Brazilian computer scientist

Carlos Ernesto Guestrin
- Born: 1975 (age 50–51); Argentina
- Education: University of São Paulo; Stanford University
- Known for: XGBoost
- Scientific career
- Fields: Computer science
- Doctoral advisor: Daphne Koller

Carlos Ernesto Guestrin (born 1975) is a Brazilian computer scientist and a professor at Stanford University. He is best known for his contributions to scalable machine learning algorithms.

== Biography ==
Guestrin was born in Argentina in 1975, but went on to be raised in Brazil. He received a Mechatronics Engineer degree from the Polytechnic School of the University of São Paulo, and a Ph.D. in Computer Science from Stanford University, advised by Daphne Koller. Guestrin went on to work as professor at Carnegie Mellon University (2004 to 2012), the University of Washington (2012-2021), and Stanford University (since 2021). He was a co-founder of Turi (formerly GraphLab), a machine learning startup that was acquired by Apple Inc. in 2016. After selling the startup, Guestrin worked at Apple as the Senior Director of Machine Learning and AI.

Guestrin was involved in the creation of various popular machine learning libraries and methods, including the XGBoost library, the LIME technique for explainable machine learning, and the GraphLab project for scalable machine learning.

== Honors and awards ==
Guestin has received multiple honors and awards, including:

- Receiving an ONR Young Investigator Award, 2008
- Receiving and IJCAI Computers and Thought Award (2009)
- Being awarded a Presidential Early Career Award (2010)
- Being elected as a Member of the National Academy of Engineering (2024)
- Receiving awards at prestigious CS conferences, including KDD 2007, KDD 2010, ACL 2020, and AISTATS 2010
