= Matthew O. Jackson =

Economist, Stanford University

- Born: 1962 (age 63–64)
- Education: Stanford University Princeton University
- Awards: Social Choice and Welfare Prize (2002); BBVA Foundation Frontiers of Knowledge Award (2021)
- Scientific career
- Fields: Economics
- Workplaces: Stanford University
- Doctoral advisor: Darrell Duffie; Dilip Mookherjee; Robert B. Wilson

Matthew Owen Jackson is the William D. Eberle Professor of Economics at Stanford University, an external faculty member of the Santa Fe Institute, and a fellow of CIFAR.

Jackson's research concerns game theory, microeconomic theory, and the study of social and economic networks. Jackson was one of the founders of the study of networks in economics. His work has analyzed the formation of networks and the sources and effects of homophily in social relationships. He has also made important contributions to the study of how networks mediate access to jobs and information as well as the contagion of financial distress.

He received his Ph.D. from Stanford University in 1988, and has taught at Northwestern University and the California Institute of Technology.

He has served as co-editor of Games and Economic Behavior, the Review of Economic Design, and Econometrica. Jackson co-teaches a popular game theory course on Coursera.org, along with Kevin Leyton-Brown and Yoav Shoham.

Jackson has been honored with the Social Choice and Welfare Prize, the B.E.Press Arrow Prize for Senior Economists, and a Guggenheim Fellowship. He has been elected to the National Academy of Sciences, the American Academy of Arts and Sciences, and is a Fellow of the Econometric Society. For 2021 he was awarded the BBVA Foundation Frontiers of Knowledge Award in Economics, Finance and Management.

== Selected publications ==
- Jackson, Matthew O. (2010). Social and Economic Networks. Princeton University Press. p. 520. ISBN 978-0-691-14820-5.
