= GraphLab =

Turi
- Developer(s): Carnegie Mellon University
- Stable release: v2.2 / July 1, 2013
- Written in: C++
- Operating system: Linux, macOS
- Type: Machine learning platform
- License: Proprietary
- Website: turi.com

Turi is a graph-based, high performance, distributed computation framework written in C++. The GraphLab project was started by Prof. Carlos Guestrin of Carnegie Mellon University in 2009. It is an open source project that uses the Apache License. While GraphLab was originally developed for machine learning tasks, it has also been developed for other data-mining tasks.

== Motivation ==
As the amounts of collected data and computing power grow (multicore, GPUs, clusters, clouds), modern datasets no longer fit into one computing node. Efficient distributed parallel algorithms for handling large-scale data are required. The GraphLab framework is a parallel programming abstraction targeted for sparse iterative graph algorithms. GraphLab provides a programming interface, allowing deployment of distributed machine learning algorithms. The main design considerations behind the design of GraphLab are:

- Sparse data with local dependencies
- Iterative algorithms
- Potentially asynchronous execution

== GraphLab toolkits ==
On top of GraphLab, several implemented libraries of algorithms:

- Topic modeling - contains applications like LDA, which can be used to cluster documents and extract topical representations.
- Graph analytics - contains applications like pagerank and triangle counting, which can be applied to general graphs to estimate community structure.
- Clustering - contains standard data clustering tools such as Kmeans
- Collaborative filtering - contains a collection of applications used to make predictions about users interests and factorize large matrices.
- Graphical models - contains tools for making joint predictions about collections of related random variables.
- Computer vision - contains a collection of tools for reasoning about images.

== Turi ==
Turi (formerly called Dato and before that GraphLab Inc.) is a company that was founded by Prof. Carlos Guestrin from University of Washington in May 2013 to continue development support of the GraphLab open source project. Dato Inc. raised a $6.75M Series A from Madrona Venture Group and New Enterprise Associates (NEA). They raised a $18.5M Series B from Vulcan Capital and Opus Capital, with participation from Madrona and NEA. On August 5, 2016, Turi was acquired by Apple Inc. for $200,000,000.
