= Yonatan Belinkov =

Computer scientist

- Education: Massachusetts Institute of Technology (PhD); Tel Aviv University (BSc, MA)
- Scientific career
- Fields: Natural language processing, machine learning
- Workplaces: Technion – Israel Institute of Technology
- Website: belinkov.com

Yonatan Belinkov is a computer scientist who works on natural language processing, machine learning and artificial intelligence. He is an associate professor in the Henry and Marilyn Taub Faculty of Computer Science at the Technion – Israel Institute of Technology.

== Education ==
Belinkov received a BSc and an MA from Tel Aviv University in mathematics and Arabic and Islamic studies. He received a PhD in electrical engineering and computer science from the Massachusetts Institute of Technology in 2018.

== Career ==
After completing his doctorate, Belinkov held postdoctoral positions at Harvard and at the MIT Computer Science and Artificial Intelligence Laboratory. He joined the Technion faculty in 2020 and is now an associate professor.

During the 2025–2026 academic year, Belinkov was a visiting scholar at Harvard's Kempner Institute.

== Contributions ==
Belinkov has worked on the analysis of neural language models, including what information is represented in different parts of a model. In research covered by MIT News in 2017 and 2019, he and collaborators studied neural networks for machine translation and speech recognition, and methods for identifying neurons associated with linguistic features such as number and gender.

With Jonathan S. Rosenfeld, Amir Rosenfeld, and Nir Shavit, he co-authored A Constructive Prediction of the Generalization Error Across Scales, an ICLR 2020 paper on predicting neural-network generalization error across model and data scales.

Belinkov also coauthored Locating and Editing Factual Associations in GPT, a 2022 NeurIPS paper that introduced Rank-One Model Editing, or ROME, a method for making targeted changes to factual associations in transformer language models without retraining the whole model. Later work on model editing has treated ROME as a central locate-and-edit method.

== Recognition ==
Belinkov received a Harvard Mind, Brain, and Behavior Postdoctoral Fellowship and an Azrieli Early Career Faculty Fellowship. In 2024, he received a European Research Council Starting Grant for Control-LM, a project on controlling large language models. In 2025, he received the Krill Prize for Excellence in Scientific Research from the Wolf Foundation.

His paper Backward Lens: Projecting Language Model Gradients into the Vocabulary Space, with Shahar Katz, Mor Geva and Lior Wolf, received a Best Paper Award at EMNLP 2024.
