= Holger H. Hoos =

German-Canadian computer scientist (born 1969)

- Education: Technische Universität Darmstadt
- Awards: ACM Fellow (2020); EurAI Fellow (2020); AAAI Fellow (2015)
- Scientific career
- Doctoral advisor: Wolfgang Bibel

Holger H. Hoos is a German-Canadian computer scientist and a Alexander von Humboldt-professor of artificial intelligence at RWTH Aachen University. He also holds a part-time appointment as a professor of machine learning at Leiden University, and he is an adjunct professor at the Computer Science Department of the University of British Columbia, where he held a full-time professorial appointment from 2000 until 2016. His research interests are focused on artificial intelligence, at the intersection of machine learning, automated reasoning and optimization, with applications in empirical algorithmics, bioinformatics and operations research. In particular, he works on automated algorithm design and on stochastic local search algorithms. Since 2015, he is a Fellow of the Association for the Advancement of Artificial Intelligence (AAAI), and since 2020 a Fellow of the European Association for Artificial Intelligence (EurAI) as well as a Fellow of the Association for Computing Machinery (ACM).

He wrote the book Stochastic Local Search: Foundations and Applications (with Thomas Stützle), and his research is published widely in internationally leading journals and conference proceedings. In 2023 he received the ACM SIGKDD test-of-time award for his work on Auto-WEKA, together with Chris Thornton, Frank Hutter and Kevin Leyton-Brown. He also works in computer music, where he created the SALIERI music programming language and computer music system (with Thomas Helbich, Jürgen Kilian and Kai Renz) as well as GUIDO music notation (with Keith Hamel).

Hoos studied computer science at Department of Computer Science of the Technische Universität Darmstadt and received his doctorate there in 1998.
