= Philipp Slusallek =

German computer scientist

Philipp Slusallek (born 1963) is a German computer scientist and professor of computer graphics at Saarland University.

== Biography ==
Philipp Slusallek studied physics at the Johann Wolfgang Goethe University Frankfurt am Main and the Eberhard Karls University of Tübingen. In 1995, he received his doctorate in computer graphics from the University of Erlangen.

After completing his doctorate, Slusallek worked at NVIDIA Research and Stanford University, among others. Since 1999 he has been Professor of Computer Graphics at Saarland University and since 2008 Scientific Director at the German Research Center for Artificial Intelligence as well as head of the Laboratory for Agents and Simulated Reality located there. Since 2009, he has also been Director of Science at the Intel Visual Computing Institute at Saarland University. In 2018, Slusallek was elected to the German Academy of Science and Engineering.

== Awards ==
- 2023: Eurographics Gold Medal
