= Weka (software) =

Suite of machine learning software written in Java

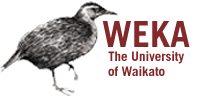
- Weka logo, featuring weka, a bird endemic to New Zealand

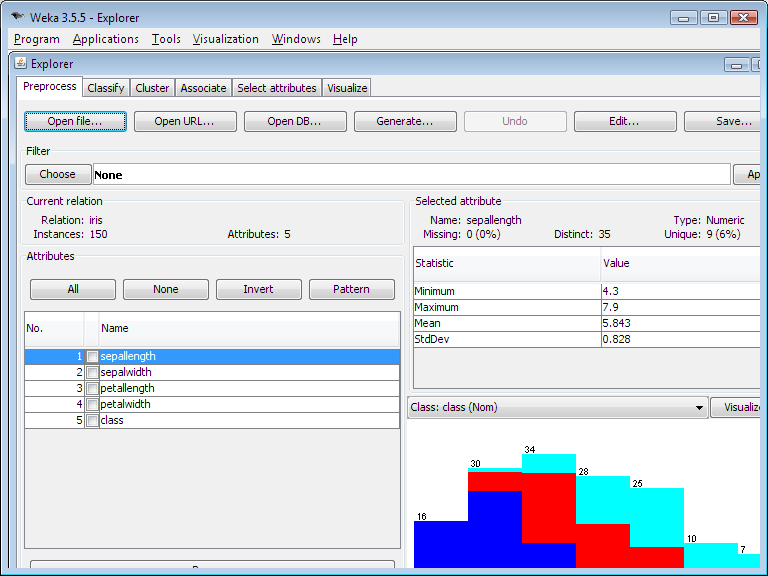
- Weka 3.5.5 Explorer window open with Iris UCI dataset
- Developer: University of Waikato
- Stable release: 3.8.7 (stable) / March 27, 2026; 4 months ago
- Preview release: 3.9.7 / March 27, 2026; 4 months ago
- Written in: Java
- Operating system: Windows, macOS, Linux
- Platform: IA-32, x86-64, ARM_architecture; Java SE
- Type: Machine learning
- License: GNU General Public License
- Website: ml.cms.waikato.ac.nz/weka
- Repository: git.cms.waikato.ac.nz/weka/weka

Waikato Environment for Knowledge Analysis (Weka) is a collection of machine learning and data analysis free software licensed under the GNU General Public License. It was developed at the University of Waikato, New Zealand, and is the companion software to the book "Data Mining: Practical Machine Learning Tools and Techniques".

== Description ==
Weka contains a collection of visualization tools and algorithms for data analysis and predictive modeling, together with graphical user interfaces for easy access to these functions. The original non-Java version of Weka was a Tcl/Tk front-end to (mostly third-party) modeling algorithms implemented in other programming languages, plus data preprocessing utilities in C, and a makefile-based system for running machine learning experiments. This original version was primarily designed as a tool for analyzing data from agricultural domains, but the more recent fully Java-based version (Weka 3), for which development started in 1997, is now used in many different application areas, in particular for educational purposes and research. Advantages of Weka include:

- Free availability under the GNU General Public License.
- Portability, since it is fully implemented in the Java programming language and thus runs on almost any modern computing platform.
- A comprehensive collection of data preprocessing and modeling techniques.
- Ease of use due to its graphical user interfaces.

Weka supports several standard data mining tasks, more specifically, data preprocessing, clustering, classification, regression, visualization, and feature selection. Input to Weka is expected to be formatted according the Attribute-Relational File Format and with the filename bearing the .arff extension. All of Weka's techniques are predicated on the assumption that the data is available as one flat file or relation, where each data point is described by a fixed number of attributes (normally, numeric or nominal attributes, but some other attribute types, such as relational attributes, are also supported). Weka provides access to SQL databases using Java Database Connectivity and can process the result returned by a database query. It is not capable of multi-relational data mining, but there is separate software for converting a collection of linked database tables into a single table that is suitable for processing using Weka. Multi-instance learning and time series forecasting are supported by corresponding packages that can be installed with the WEKA package manager. Access to machine learning functionality in R and Python is also available through WEKA packages (via the RPlugin, wekaPython, and WekaPyScript packages, respectively). Weka provides limited access to deep learning in Java with Deeplearning4j.

== Extension packages ==
In version 3.7.2, a package manager was added to allow the easier installation of extension packages. Some functionality that used to be included with Weka prior to this version has since been moved into such extension packages, but this change also makes it easier for others to contribute extensions to Weka and to maintain the software, as this modular architecture allows independent updates of the Weka core and individual extensions.

== History ==
- In 1993, the University of Waikato in New Zealand began development of the original version of Weka, which became a mix of Tcl/Tk, C, and makefiles.
- In 1997, the decision was made to redevelop Weka from scratch in Java, including implementations of modeling algorithms.
- In 2005, Weka received the SIGKDD Data Mining and Knowledge Discovery Service Award.
- In 2006, Pentaho Corporation acquired an exclusive licence to use Weka for business intelligence. It forms the data mining and predictive analytics component of the Pentaho business intelligence suite. Pentaho has since been acquired by Hitachi Vantara, and Weka now underpins the PMI (Plugin for Machine Intelligence) open source component.

== Related tools ==
- Auto-WEKA is an automated machine learning system for Weka.
- Environment for DeveLoping KDD-Applications Supported by Index-Structures (ELKI) is a similar project to Weka with a focus on cluster analysis, i.e., unsupervised methods.
- KNIME is a machine learning and data mining software implemented in Java.
- Massive Online Analysis (MOA) is an open-source project for large scale mining of data streams, also developed at the University of Waikato in New Zealand.
- Neural Designer is a data mining software based on deep learning techniques written in C++.
- Orange is a similar open-source project for data mining, machine learning and visualization based on scikit-learn.
- RapidMiner is a commercial machine learning framework implemented in Java which integrates Weka.
- scikit-learn is a popular machine learning library in Python.

== See also ==
- Comparison of machine learning software
- List of numerical-analysis software
