= Kevin Leyton-Brown =

Canadian computer scientist (born 1975)

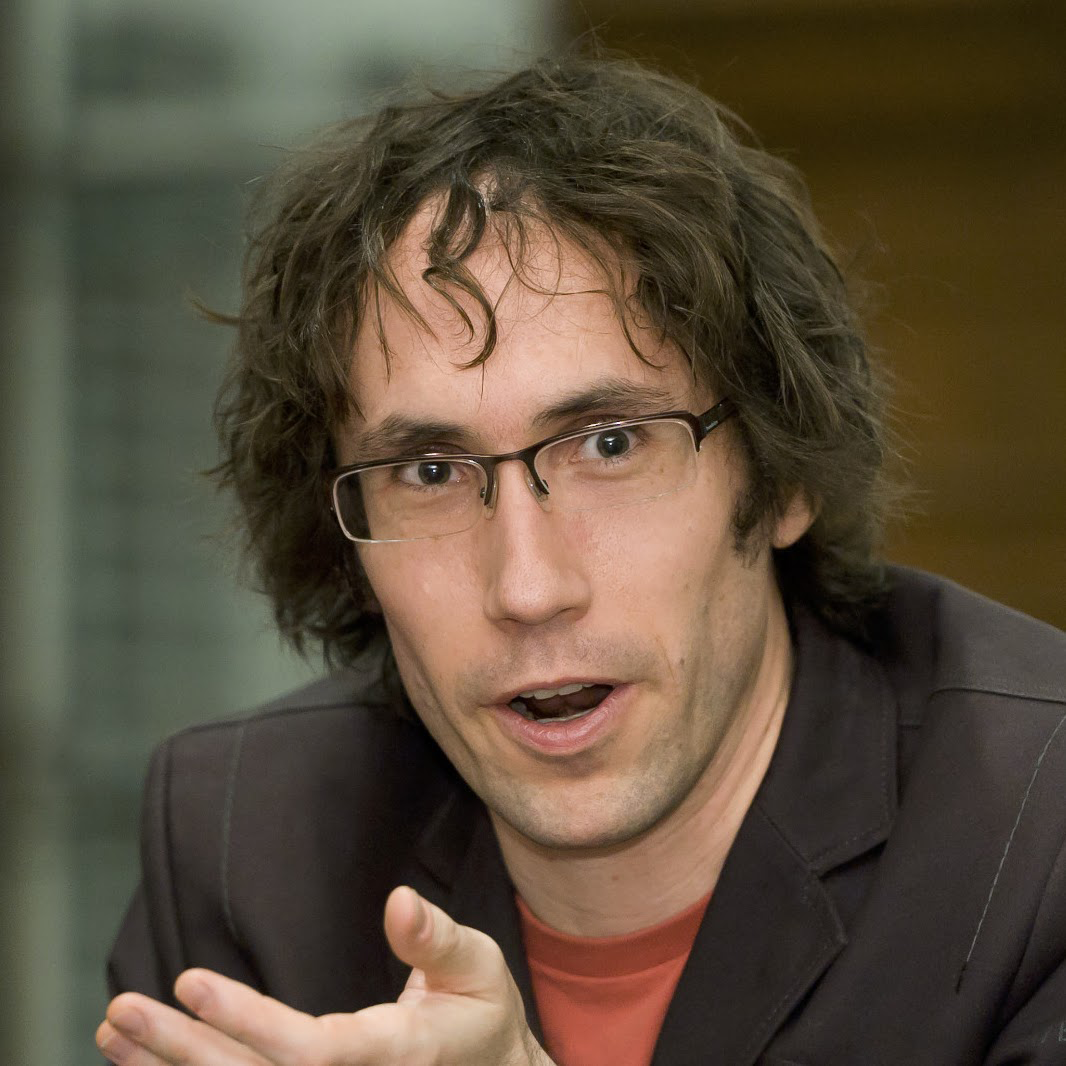
- Born: May 12, 1975 (age 51); Canada
- Education: McMaster University; Stanford University
- Awards: NSERC E.W.R. Steacie Memorial Fellowship
- Scientific career
- Fields: Computer Science, Economics
- Workplaces: University of British Columbia
- Doctoral advisor: Yoav Shoham
- Website: https://www.cs.ubc.ca/~kevinlb/

Kevin Leyton-Brown (born May 12, 1975) is a Professor of Computer Science at the University of British Columbia.

== Education ==
He received his Ph.D. at Stanford University in 2003.

== Career ==
Leyton-Brown co-teaches a popular game theory course on Coursera.org, along with Matthew O. Jackson and Yoav Shoham. Leyton-Brown serves as an associate editor for the Journal of Artificial Intelligence Research, the Artificial Intelligence journal, and ACM Transactions on Economics and Computation, and was program chair for the ACM Conference on Electronic Commerce in 2012.

Leyton-Brown's research is at the intersection of computer science and microeconomics, addressing computational problems in economic contexts and incentive issues in multiagent systems. He also studies the application of machine learning to the automated design and analysis of algorithms for solving hard computational problems. In 2023, Leyton-Brown was named a Fellow of the Royal Society of Canada.

== Awards and honors ==
Leyton-Brown and coauthors have received the IJCAI-JAIR Best Paper Prize, the ACM SIGKDD test-of-time award for his work on Auto-WEKA, and numerous medals in international SAT competitions (2003–12).

He was the recipient of a 2014 NSERC E.W.R. Steacie Memorial Fellowship, a 2013/14 Killam Teaching Prize, and a 2013 Outstanding Young Computer Science Researcher Prize from the Canadian Association of Computer Science.

He was elected an AAAI Fellow and an ACM Distinguished Member in 2018.

== Selected publications ==
- Shoham, Yoav; Leyton-Brown, Kevin (2009). Multiagent Systems: Algorithmic, Game-Theoretic, and Logical Foundations. Cambridge University Press. p. 496. ISBN 978-0-521-89943-7.
- Leyton-Brown, Kevin; Shoham, Yoav (2008). Essentials of Game Theory: A Concise, Multidisciplinary Introduction. San Rafael, CA: Morgan & Claypool Publishers. ISBN 978-1-59829-593-1.
