= ACM Conference on Fairness, Accountability, and Transparency =

Academic conference series

- Abbreviation: FAccT
- Discipline: Computer science

Publication details
- Publisher: Association for Computing Machinery
- History: 2018 - current (8 years)
- Frequency: Annual
- Open access: Yes
- Website: https://facctconference.org/

ACM Conference on Fairness, Accountability, and Transparency (ACM FAccT, formerly known as ACM FAT*) is a peer-reviewed academic conference series about ethics and computing systems. Sponsored by the Association for Computing Machinery, this conference focuses on issues such as algorithmic transparency, fairness in machine learning, bias, and ethics from a multi-disciplinary perspective. The conference community includes computer scientists, statisticians, social scientists, scholars of law, and others.

The conference is sponsored by Big Tech companies such as Facebook, Twitter, and Google, and large foundations such as the Rockefeller Foundation, Ford Foundation, MacArthur Foundation, and Luminate. Sponsors contribute to a general fund (no "earmarked" contributions are allowed) and have no say in the selection, substance, or structure of the conference.

== FATE Overview ==
The acronym FATE refers to Fairness, Accountability, Transparency, and Ethics in sociotechnical systems. FATE is a topic of rising interest as the societal and ethical implications of complex systems such as artificial intelligence (AI), machine learning (ML), and natural language processing (NLP) are increasing. The topic provides an interdisciplinary challenge of bridging the gap of transparency between technical and non technical academics and policy makers to ensure the safety and equity of algorithmic systems as they advance at a rapid rate. Some solutions and techniques that have been discovered include Explainable artificial intelligence (XAI).

Recent adoptions of AI in both the public and private sector include the predictive recidivism algorithm (otherwise known as COMPAS) which was deployed in the US Court, as well as Amazon's AI Powered recruitment tool, later proven to favor male over female applicants. Further, AI based decision support (ADS) powered by machine learning techniques is more commonly being integrated across fields including criminal justice, education, and benefits provision. FATE functions as a means to look further into algorithms to raise awareness and work towards a solution. Companies such as Microsoft have created research teams specifically devoted to the topic.

== Key Research Areas and Emerging Trends in FATE ==
The FAccT Conference 2024 is looking for articles specifically within the following areas: Audits and Evaluation Practices, System Development and Deployment, Experiences and Interactions, Critical Studies, Law and Policy, and Philosophy.

== Impact and Influence ==
The research from the ACM FAccT conference has greatly influenced both public rules and how companies operate. Governments and organizations have used ideas from the conference to create guidelines and policies. For example, studies on bias in algorithms have helped change hiring methods at big tech companies, making them fairer. Additionally, laws about how artificial intelligence (AI) should be managed have been shaped by this research. The conference has also helped guide global discussions about ethical AI, contributing to important guidelines like the European Union's AI Act and the AI Principles from the OECD.

== Criticisms and Controversies ==
Although the ACM FAccT conference is well-regarded, it has received some criticism. Some people say that the ideas shared at the conference are often too focused on theory and may not work well for real-world issues. Others have noticed that even though the conference talks about fairness and transparency in AI, the companies that sponsor it don't always create technology that follows these values. There is also debate about whether the conference can stay truly independent while receiving money from big tech companies.

== List of conferences ==
Past and future FAccT conferences include:

Year	Location	Date	Keynote/Invited speakers	Link
2027	Porto, Portugal	June 21-24	TBA	Call for papers
2026	Montreal, Canada	June 25-28	Krishna Gummadi, Charlton McIlwain, Lucy Suchman, Jutta Treviranus, Michael Karlin, Cynthia Khoo, Paris Marx, Joelle Pineau, Christelle Tessono	Website
2025	Athens, Greece	June 23-26	Nathalie Smuha, Suresh Venkatasubramanian, Kristian Lum, Molly J. Crockett	Website
2024	Rio de Janeiro, Brazil	June 3–6	Virgilio Almeida, Seeta Peña Gangadharan, Joaquim Melo, Nina da Hora, Alexsandro Mesquita, Stephanie Nguyen, Polinho Mota, Sanmi Koyejo	Website
2023	Chicago, Illinois and online	June 12–15	Payal Arora, Charlotte Burrows, Alex Hanna, Moritz Hardt, Alondra Nelson, Ziad Obermeyer	Website
2022	Seoul, South Korea and online	June 21–24	Cha Meeyoung, Pascale Fung, Mariano-Florentino Cuéllar, André Brock	Website
2021	Online	March 3–10	Yeshimabeit Milner, Katrina Ligett, Julia Angwin	Website
2020	Barcelona, Spain	January 27–30	Ayanna Howard, Yochai Benkler, Nani Jansen Reventlow	Website
2019	Atlanta, Georgia	January 29–31	Jon Kleinberg, Deirdre Mulligan	Website
2018	New York, New York	February 23–24	Latanya Sweeney, Deborah Hellman	Website

== See also ==
- Algorithmic bias
- Artificial intelligence art
- Artificial intelligence marketing
- Ethics of artificial intelligence
