= APR =

APR or Apr may refer to:

== Economics ==
- Annual percentage rate, the interest rate computed for an entire year
  - The term includes the nominal APR and the effective APR

== Organizations ==
- Agrarian Party of Russia, a left-wing political party in Russia
- Alabama Public Radio
- Algarve Pro Racing, Portuguese auto racing team
- American Public Radio, now Public Radio International
- Andy Petree Racing, stock car auto racing team
- Appian Publications & Recordings
- Armée Patriotique Rwandaise FC, Rwandan association football club
- APR BBC, a Rwandan basketball club
- Asia Pacific Rayon, Indonesian-based viscose-rayon producer
- Asia-Pacific Scout Region (World Organization of the Scout Movement)
- Apr (racing team), Japanese auto racing team

== Technology ==
- Acoustic paramagnetic resonance, a resonant absorption effect used in magnetic resonance spectroscopy
- Acute phase reaction, a reaction due to the presence of inflammatory allergens
- Advanced port replicator, a docking device
- Ammonium perrhenate, a compound of rhenium
- Apache Portable Runtime, a library for the Apache web server
- Apple ProRes, a video compression format
- ARP poison routing, spoofing of the address resolution protocol (ARP)
- Brügger & Thomet APR, the Advanced Precision Rifle, a Swiss sniper rifle
- The APR-1400 and APR+ advanced pressurized reactor, a series of South Korean pressurized water nuclear reactors
- Air-Purifying Respirator
- Automatic program repair
- Automated Pain Recognition

== Other uses ==
- Abdominoperineal resection
- Academic Progress Rate, an NCAA (National Collegiate Athletic Association) guideline
- Accreditation in Public Relations
- Acute phase reactant, a class of proteins
- Adleman–Pomerance–Rumely primality test to check whether a given number is prime
- African Peer Review Mechanism, an African Union self-monitoring mechanism
- Alberta Prairie Railway Excursions
- Alternative Press Review, a left-wing American political magazine
- April, as an abbreviation for the fourth month of the year in the Gregorian calendar
- The Chief Scouts' Advance Party Report, a review of Scouting that took place in the UK in 1966
- A retired US Navy hull classification symbol: Convoy rescue craft (APR)
- Anuppur Junction railway station (station code: APR), Chhattisgarh, India
