= Senghor (surname) =

Senghor or Senghore is a Serer surname – an ethnic group found in Senegal, Gambia and Mauritania. Notable people with this surname include:

- André Senghor (born 1986), Senegalese footballer
- Augustin Diamacoune Senghor (1928–2007), Senegalese Catholic priest and Casamance separatist
- Augustin Senghor (born 1965), Senegalese politician
- Blaise Senghor (1932–1976), Senegalese film director, nephew of Léopold Sédar Senghor
- Colette Senghor (1925–2019), French public figure and First Lady of Senegal as the wife of Léopold Sédar Senghor
- Constance Senghor (born 1963), Senegalese athlete
- Fatou Jagne Senghore (born 1970), Gambian-Senegalese activist and lawyer
- Fatou Kandé Senghor (born 1971), Senegalese film director, writer, and photographer
- Faustin Senghor (born 1994), Senegalese footballer
- Lamine Senghor (1889–1927), Senegalese political activist
- Léopold Sédar Senghor (1906–2001), Senegalese poet and cultural theorist, first president of Senegal
- Louis Jacques Senghor (born 1952), Senegalese politician
- Marie Senghor Basse (1930–2019), Senegalese physician
- Robert Coleman-Senghor (1940–2011), American professor and politician
- Shaka Senghor (born 1978), American college lecturer and author
