= Algorithmic regulation =

Algorithmic regulation may refer to:

- Government by algorithm, use of algorithms in government
- Regulation of algorithms, rules and laws for algorithms
