= A Human Algorithm =

Book by Flynn Coleman

- First edition
- Author: Flynn Coleman
- Language: English
- Genre: Popular science
- Publisher: Counterpoint Press
- Publication date: 2019
- Publication place: United States
- Pages: 336 pp (hardcover 1st edition)
- ISBN: 9781640092365 (hardcover 1st edition)

A Human Algorithm: How Artificial Intelligence Is Redefining Who We Are is a 2019 non-fiction book by American international human rights attorney Flynn Coleman. It argues that, in order to manage the power shift from humans to increasingly advanced artificial intelligence, it will be necessary to instill human values into artificial intelligence, and to proactively develop oversight mechanisms.

== Overview ==
Coleman argues that the algorithms underlying artificial intelligence could greatly improve the human condition, if the algorithms are carefully based on ethical human values. An ideal artificial intelligence would be "not a replicated model of our own brains, but an expansion of our lens and our vantage point as to what intelligence, life, meaning, and humanity are and can be." Failure in this regard might leave us "a species without a purpose", lacking "any sense of happiness, meaning, or satisfaction". She states that despite stirrings of an "algorithmic accountability movement", humanity is "alarmingly unready" for the arrival of more powerful forms of artificial intelligence.

== Reception ==
A review in Library Journal strongly recommended the book to "both the cyber crowds and those interested in human psychology". Kirkus Reviews called the book "meaty" and "energetic". Publishers Weekly judged the book's optimism to be unconvincing.

== See also ==
- Existential risk from artificial general intelligence
- Regulation of algorithms
