= Automated decision support =

Automated Decision Support (ADS) systems are computer-based tools that use predefined rules to automatically solve routine and repetitive management problems. These systems assist human decision-makers by providing recommendations or solutions based on structured business rules, but typically the final decision remains with a person (unlike fully automated decision-making, where decisions are made entirely by computer systems without human intervention).

At the core of an ADS are business rules—explicit, formalized guidelines that define how decisions should be made. These rules are created and maintained through business analytics and guide the system in selecting appropriate actions based on the data and context.

== Components ==
Components of ADSs are often provided by software development companies and include:

- Rules engines
- Mathematical and statistical algorithms
- Industry-specific software packages
- Enterprise systems
- Workflow applications

== See also ==
- Decision support system
- Enterprise Decision Management
