= Payal Arora =

Indian anthropologist

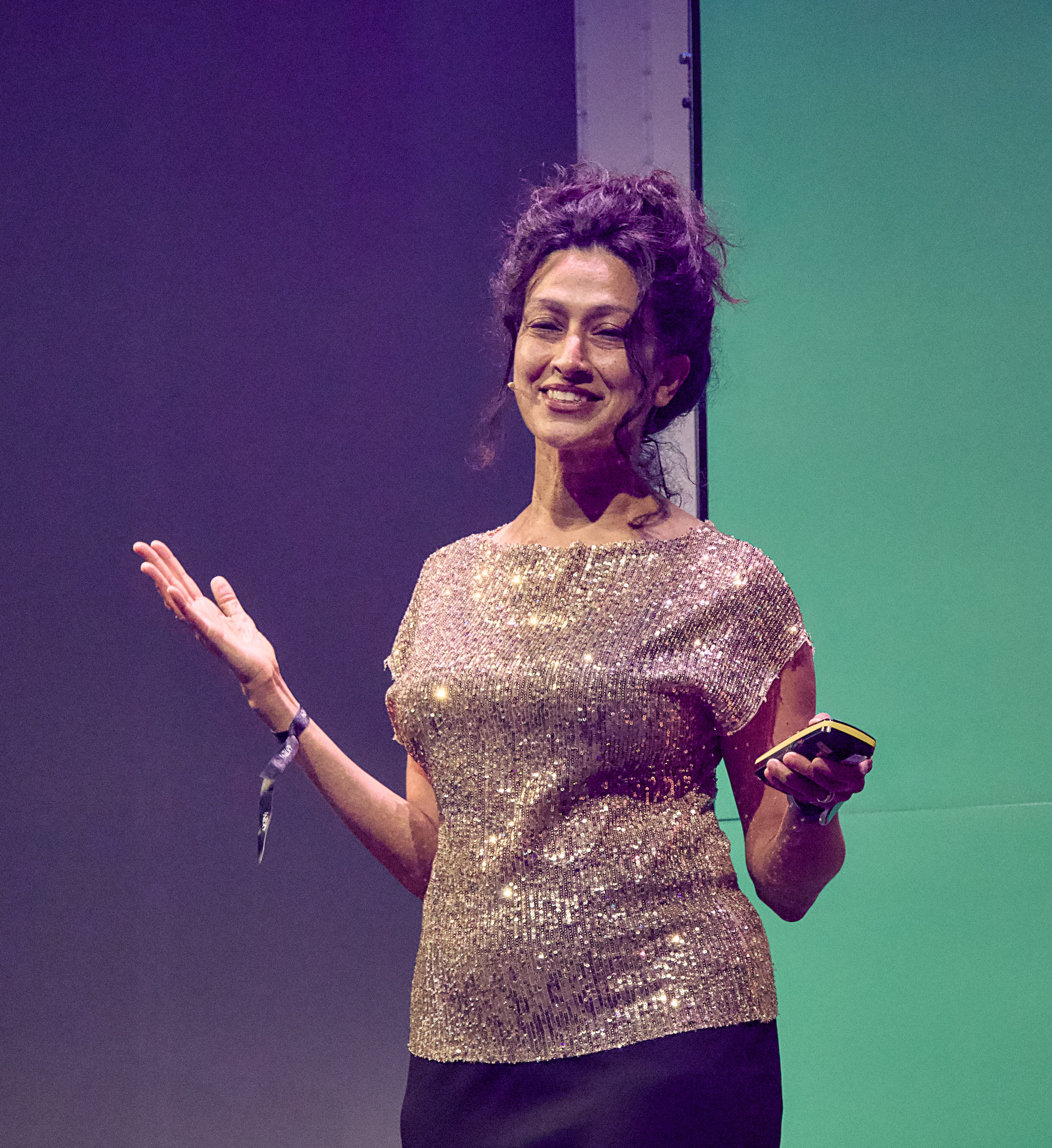
- Payal Arora in 2024
- Born: Bengaluru, India
- Education: Columbia University; Harvard University
- Occupations: Professor of Inclusive AI Cultures, co-founder of Inclusive AI Lab
- Employer: Utrecht University
- Known for: The Next Billion Users; From Pessimism to Promise; The Inclusive AI Lab; Listed among the 100 Brilliant Women in AI Ethics (2025)
- Awards: Erasmus University Rotterdam Education Prize (2017); EUR Fellowship Award (2012); Association of American Publishers PROSE award for Best book in Business, Management, and Finance (2020); Women in AI Benelux Award (2025); Silver Medal by Axiom Business Book Awards (2025)
- Website: payalarora.com https://femlab.co/ https://www.uu.nl/staff/PArora https://inclusiveailab.org/

Payal Arora is a digital anthropologist, author, and Professor and holds the Chair in Inclusive AI Cultures at Utrecht University. She is the founder of Inclusive AI Lab, and FemLab, a feminist future of work initiative. Her work focuses on internet usage in the Global South, specifically on global digital cultures, inequality and data governance. She is Indian, American, and Irish and currently lives in Amsterdam.

== Early life and education ==
Payal Arora was born in India. She holds a Master's degree in International Development Policy from Harvard University and a doctoral degree in Language, Literacy & Technology from Columbia University.

== Career ==
Arora was at Erasmus University Rotterdam for 15 years where she served as a Professor of Technology, Values and Global Media Cultures and expert leader in UX Research and Global Tech Design at the Erasmus Center for Data Analytics.

Arora has been a Professor and Chair in Inclusive AI Cultures at the department of Media and Culture Studies at Utrecht University since January 2023. In 2020, she co-founded FemLab, a feminist future of work initiative that translates digital ethnographic insights around user-experiences of women workers at the margins using digital tools into actionable policies and platform interventions.

In 2024 she co-founded the Inclusive AI Lab with the focus to incubate leaders and help build inclusive and sustainable AI data, tools, services, and platforms, with a special focus on the Global South.

== Work ==
She has written on digital cultures and inequality in the Global South. She has authored and co-edited numerous papers and books and delivered hundreds of talks around the world, including two TEDx talks on the future of the internet and on why we need less innovation. Forbes called her “next billion champion” in reference to her award-winning book “The Next Billion Users: Digital Life Beyond the West” which examines the online behavior of citizens in India, China, South Africa, Brazil, and the Middle East. The book has been featured by publications such as The Economist, TechCrunch and Frankfurter Allgemeine Zeitung. Engadget stated that her Harvard book is one of “the most interesting, thought-provoking books on science and technology we can find.”

In 2021, the UNHCR Innovation Services commissioned Arora to execute a field study and report on the digital leisure divide and the forcibly replaced in Brazil. In 2016, she was commissioned by UNESCO to write up a report on prize-based incentives for innovations in ICTs in education which was presented at the Mobile Learning Week at UNESCO Paris. In 2023, she was selected as a Resident Fellow at the Bellagio Center, an international residency of the Rockefeller Foundation awarded to leading scholars, artists, and practitioners.

In 2024, she published a book with MIT Press ‘From Pessimism to Promise: Lessons from the Global South on Designing Inclusive Tech.’ The book examines contrasting global attitudes toward emerging technologies, arguing that public discourse in Western countries has become increasingly pessimistic about technologies such as artificial intelligence, while communities in the Global South often express greater optimism despite acknowledged risks and harms. Drawing on ethnographic research and collaborations with public and private organizations in the Global South, Arora contends that this “pessimism bias” can obscure how such technologies may address diverse aspirations and urgent needs in these contexts.

The book received endorsements from author of Design of Everyday things Don Norman, Leyla Acaroglu, Founder of Disrupt Design, Gina Neff, Minderoo Centre for Technology and Democracy at the University of Cambridge, Arundhati Bhattacharya, Chairperson & CEO, Salesforce India, and Charles Hayes, former IDEO managing director and partner. The book has been covered by several international media outlets including The Financial Times, de Volkskrant, and UX magazine.

Arora is a member of several boards and advisory committees, including Facebook's Social Science One, FutureWorks Asia, Bridging Divides, UNU EGov and ICRIER Prosus Centre for Internet and Digital Economy. She is a Rockefeller Bellagio Resident Fellow.

== Awards ==
In 2017 her teaching was awarded with the Erasmus University Rotterdam's Education Prize.

The Next Billion Users book by Harvard Press won the 2020 PROSE Award by The Association of American Publishers (AAP) under the Business, Management, Finance category. Her book ‘From Pessimism to Promise’ by MIT Press won the Silver Medal by Axiom Business Book Awards 2025 under the Emerging Trends/AI category, and was longlisted for the 2024 Porchlight Business Book Awards under the Innovation and Creativity category.

== In the media ==
Arora has been writing about the impact of new digital technologies in the Global South, with a special focus on India, Brazil, Namibia, and Bangladesh where she conducted fieldwork. She has been invited by public and private organizations to comment on how to build technologies that include the world. Her work has been featured in international media outlets including the Het Financieele Dagblad (Netherlands), The Economist (UK), Quartz (USA), Frankfurter Allgemeine Zeitung (Germany), Canadian Broadcasting Corporation, De Standaard (Belgium), Le Monde (France), and Times of India (India).

In 2019, she was invited on the "We the People" NDTV Indian Television Talk Show in 2019 to discuss "Is social media deciding self-worth?" In 2020, she was invited on the award-winning podcast 99% Invisible on the theme ‘next billion users.’ On this podcast, she discussed with host Roman Mars on how these new online users are changing the ways in which we think and use technology. In 2020 she wrote an op-ed for NRC Handelsblad critiquing the viral essay by Rutger Bregman on "The real lord of the flies" by arguing that it was a typical white savior focused story, and not representative of the historical colonial context. She was an early contributor to the Ideas section for the award-winning global media outlet Rest of World, with the opinion piece "AI isn’t going to save us."

In 2025 she was interviewed as a contributor in the Al Jazeera documentary ‘How Technocracy Has Become Our Reality’, which examines the historical rise of technocratic power and its implications for democracy and participated in a Doha Debates discussion on youth, technology, and the attention economy, examining whether digital platforms empower children or primarily serve commercial interests.

== Bibliography ==
- Arora, Payal (2010). Dot com mantra : social computing in the Central Himalayas. Burlington, VT: Ashgate. ISBN 978-1409401070.
- Been, Wouter (2015). Crossroads in new media, identity, and law : the shape of diversity to come. Houndmills, Basingstoke, Hampshire New York: Palgrave Macmillan. ISBN 978-1137491251.
- Arora, Payal (2016). Leisure commons. Place of publication not identified: Routledge. ISBN 978-1138688049.
- Arora, Payal (2019). The next billion users : digital life beyond the West. Cambridge, Massachusetts: Harvard University Press. ISBN 978-0674983786.
- Arora, Payal; Raman, Usha; König, René (2023). Feminist Futures of Work: Reimagining Labour in the Digital Economy. Amsterdam: Amsterdam University Press. p. 348. ISBN 9789463728386.
- Arora, Payal (2024). From pessimism to promise: lessons from the Global South on designing inclusive tech. Cambridge, Massachusetts: MIT Press. ISBN 9780262049306.
