= Fatou Jagne Senghore =

Gambian Jurist, human rights advocate

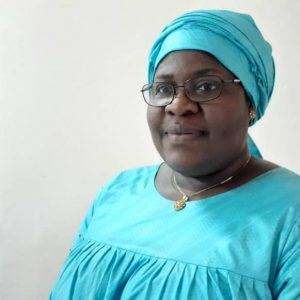
- Born: 10 April 1970 (age 56); Banjul, Gambia
- Other name: Senegambian Iron Lady
- Education: Lycée Sénégalais de Banjul; Cheikh Anta Diop University; University of Toulouse Capitole
- Occupations: Jurist, human rights advocate
- Spouse: Alasan Senghore
- Children: 2
- Awards: Ordre national du Mérite (2018); West African Shield Award (2019)

Fatou Jagne Senghore (or Senghor; born 10 April 1970) is a Gambian jurist, human rights advocate, women's rights and free expression specialist. She is well known for her work in human rights in West Africa, especially in the Gambia and Senegal. She earned the nickname of "Senegambian Iron Lady" for her efforts defending human rights in the Gambia under the autocratic leadership of Yahya Jammeh.

== Early life and education ==
Born in the Gambia, her father was Senegalese, from Rufisque. Her mother, Gambian (great-granddaughter of Konko Abari Gaye/Pompeh Gaye) Pompeh Gaye

She attended elementary school in Rufisque after moving to Senegal. Jagne married Alasan Senghore, who works for International Federation of Red Cross and Red Crescent Societies.

After completing her primary education in Senegal, Jagne returned to The Gambia and graduated from the Lycée Sénégalais de Banjul with a Baccalauréat degree A. She studied law briefly In 1991 at Université Cheikh Anta Diop before moving to France in 1992.

She graduated with Bachelor of Laws from the University of Toulouse in France. The same year, she obtained a diploma in International Relations and Development Studies and a Bachelor of Language/Cambridge English Law Speciality.

In 1997, she completed a master's degree in International and European Law and in 1998 obtained an LLM in Economic and Communication Law under a fellowship of the University of Toulouse.

== Career ==
Jagne Senghor has over 25 years of experience working on human rights in Africa (gaining expertise on freedom of expression, access to information, media regulation and the African regional system of human rights). In 1998, she returned to The Gambia. She worked as a programme officer at the Institute for Human Rights and Development in Africa in Banjul from 1999 to 2001. She was instrumental in initiating several training programmes for lawyers and judiciary and started the first compilation of the Decisions of the African Commission on Human and Peoples' Rights (ACHPR). Jagne Senghor also served as a freelance reporter and news presenter for the French weekly news for Gambia Radio and Television Service (GRTS). In February 2002, she joined the British-based human rights organisation Article 19 as the Africa Program Officer in Johannesburg. She has worked with various governments and non-governmental organisations on reforming media policies and freedom of expression in Africa. Jagne Senghor has also taken part in various litigation and campaigns on behalf of victims of human rights violations in many parts of Africa particularly in Senegal, Mali, Niger, Burkina Faso, Guinea, Zimbabwe, Mauritania, Eritrea and The Gambia.

She worked with women's organisations in Senegal to raise public awareness on the parity law adopted in 2010 to facilitate women's access to the media. She has also participated in many supportive programmes development for Article 19 in Tunisia and Tunisia Monitoring Group. Jagne Senghor also conducted investigations regarding restrictions on freedom of expression in Tunisia representing Article 19, founding member of International Freedom of Expression Exchange. In 2010, she established the West African branch of Article 19 in Senegal, rising up in the ranks to become regional director in 2013.

For two decades, she supported the work of the African Commission on Human and Peoples' Rights (ACHPR) and led the advocacy for the adoption of the declaration of Principles on Freedom of Expression in Africa. She also supported the development of the framework for the establishment of mechanism of the Special Rapporteur on Freedom of Expression in Africa in 2015.

In 2022, Jagne stepped down as Regional Director of ARTICLE 19 and returned to the Gambia where she continues supporting the transitional justice process. She has recently established the Center for Women's Rights and Leadership (CWRL), a platform to advance women's rights, political participation, and leadership in the Gambia.

In 2023, she was nominated by the Attorney General and Minister of Justice along 2 Eminent Persons as Moral Guarantors (The President of the Supreme Islamic Council, The Gambia and Chairman Gambia Christian Council ) to support the mediation process for a new Constitution for the Gambia. The team is led by an International Mediator, Mohamed Ibn Chambas.

== Honours ==
In April 2018, Jagne Senghore was awarded the prestigious honour of Chevalier dans l'Ordre National du Mérite (Knight of the National Order of Merit/Ordre national du Mérite) by the President of France. She was also listed among the 100 Most Influential African Women in 2019 and was awarded the West African Shield Award by the Pan-African Human Rights Defender Network in June 2019.

In 2020, she received the Gambia Press Union Press Freedom Hero Award and in 2021, the Deyda Hydara Award for Press Freedom for her work on impunity and Legacy in Activism Award by SheAwards Gambia in 2023.

She is an Amujae Leader 2023 of the Ellen Johnson Sirleaf Presidential Center for Women and Development.

In 2019, she was appointed as chair of the Board of Directors of the Gambia Radio and Television Services (GRTS) by the President of the Gambia, Adama Barrow. In 2022, she was elected Chair of the Governing Council of the African Freedom of Information Center (AFIC). In June 2020, it was announced that Jagne Senghore was one of the four candidates for the position of UN Special Rapporteur on the Promotion and Protection of the Right to Freedom of Opinion and Expression. Other candidates were Irene Khan, Nani Jansen Reventlow and Agustina del Campo. Irene Khan got the position.
