= Ziad Obermeyer =

Lebanese-American physician and researcher

- زياد أوبرماير
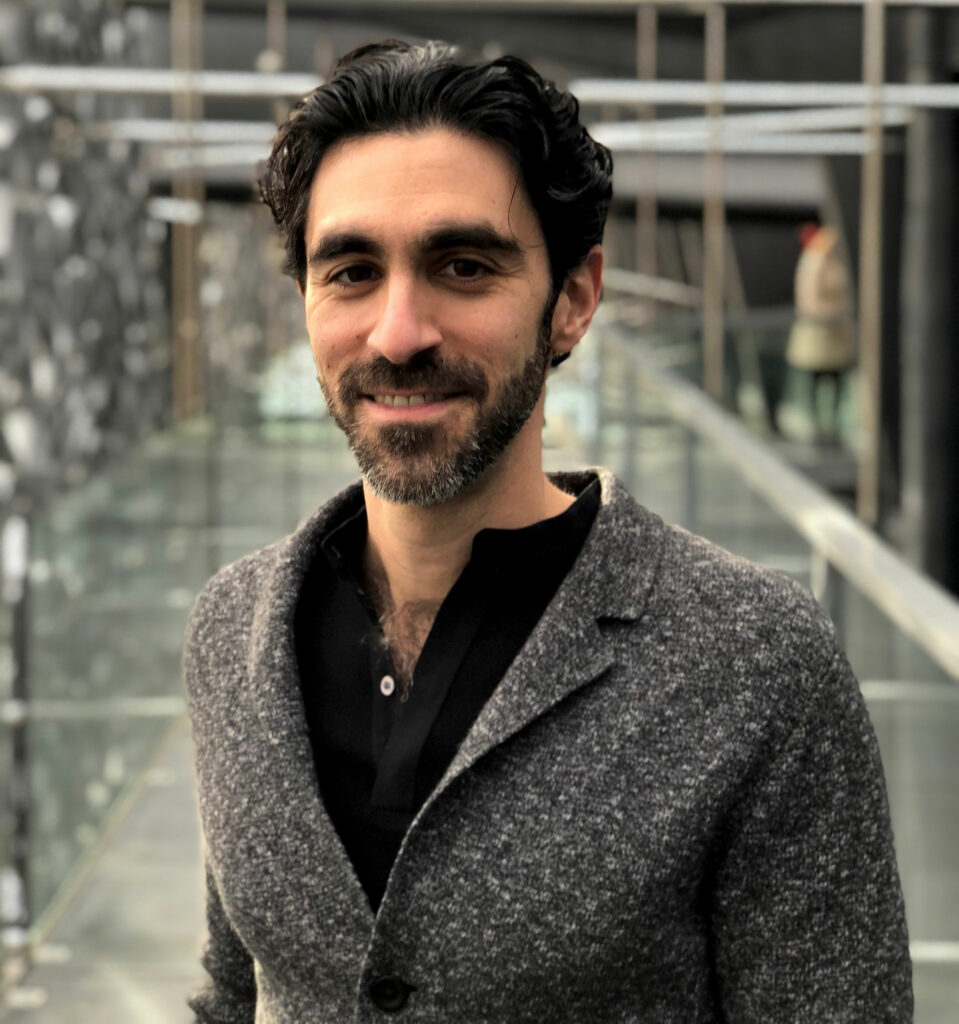
- Obermeyer in 2019
- Citizenship: American
- Education: Harvard College, University of Cambridge, Harvard Medical School
- Occupations: Physician, researcher
- Employer: University of California, Berkeley

Ziad Obermeyer (Arabic: زياد أوبرماير) is a Lebanese American physician and researcher whose work focuses on machine learning, health policy, and clinical decision-making in medicine. He is the Blue Cross of California Distinguished Associate Professor at the UC Berkeley School of Public Health, a Chan Zuckerberg Biohub investigator, Associate Dean for Innovation and Entrepreneurship, and a research associate at the National Bureau of Economic Research. He is known for his research on racial bias in health care algorithms and the use of artificial intelligence in health care.

== Early life and education ==
Obermeyer was born in Beirut, Lebanon, and raised in Cambridge, Massachusetts. He earned a Bachelor of Arts degree from Harvard College and a Master of Philosophy (M.Phil.) in History and Science from the University of Cambridge. He received his Doctor of Medicine (M.D.) from Harvard Medical School in 2008.

Before pursuing medicine, Obermeyer worked as a consultant at McKinsey & Company, advising pharmaceutical and global health clients in New Jersey, Geneva, and Tokyo.

After completing his medical degree, he trained as an emergency physician at Mass General Brigham (MGB) in Boston, Massachusetts. He later continued practicing emergency medicine at the Fort Defiance Indian Hospital on the Navajo Nation in Arizona.

== Academic career ==
Obermeyer served as an Assistant Professor at Harvard Medical School from 2014 to 2020. In 2020, he joined the University of California, Berkeley as an Associate Professor and the Blue Cross of California Distinguished Professor at the School of Public Health.

== Research focus ==
=== Algorithmic racial bias in healthcare ===
In 2019, Obermeyer and economist Sendhil Mullainathan examined a commercial healthcare algorithm by UnitedHealth Group, used in hospitals and by insurers to identify patients with complex health needs. The study found that the algorithm underestimated the health needs of Black patients compared to white patients with similar conditions and that reformulating it would reduce racial bias.

In 2020, Obermeyer analyzed an algorithm used to allocate CARE Act relief funding to hospitals. The study identified allocation patterns that favored hospitals with higher revenues over hospitals serving larger numbers of COVID-19 patients who are predominantly Black.

=== Clinical decision-making ===
In 2021, Obermeyer and colleagues examined physician decision-making in cardiac care using machine learning models. The study found that physicians misdiagnose cases when they rely on symptoms representative of a heart attack, such as chest pain, over other symptoms.

=== Pain assessment ===
Obermeyer developed a deep learning approach to investigate the severity of osteoarthritis in underserved communities.

== Policy and regulatory work ==
Following the publication of the 2019 algorithmic racial bias study, the New York Department of Financial Services and Department of Health launched an investigation into UnitedHealth Group's algorithm, requesting that the company cease using it, citing discriminatory business practices. Also related to this study, in December 2019, Democratic Senators Cory Booker and Ron Wyden released letters to the Federal Trade Commission and Centers for Medicare and Medicaid Services asking to investigate potential discrimination in decision-making algorithms against marginalized communities in healthcare. The senators also wrote to major healthcare companies, including Aetna and Blue Cross Blue Shield, about their internal safeguards against racial bias in their technology.

In 2021, Obermeyer and colleagues at the University of Chicago Booth School of Business released the Algorithmic Bias Playbook, a resource for policymakers and technical teams working in healthcare on how to measure and mitigate algorithmic racial bias.

Obermeyer testified before the U.S. Senate Financial Committee in February 2024 on artificial intelligence in healthcare, recommending transparency requirements for AI developers and independent algorithm evaluations. In December 2025, he testified before the United States House Committee on Oversight and Government Reform on the role of AI in affordable healthcare and the impact of its integration on the workforce.

== Organizations ==
In 2021, Obermeyer cofounded Nightingale Open Science, a non-profit that creates new medical imaging datasets available for research, and Dandelion Health, a health data analytics company. In June 2023, the company launched a program to audit and evaluate the performance of algorithms to identify potential racial, ethnic, and geographic bias, funded by the Gordon and Betty Moore Foundation and the SCAN Foundation. Dandelion Health partnered with the American Heart Association in 2025 to power an AI assessment lab for cardiovascular algorithms.

Obermeyer is a founding faculty member of the University of California, Berkeley–University of California, San Francisco joint program in computational precision health.

== Recognition ==
TIME magazine named Obermeyer one of the 100 most influential people in artificial intelligence in 2023. He has served as a Chan Zuckerberg Biohub Investigator since 2022, and as a Research Associate at the National Bureau of Economic Research since 2023. He was designated an Emerging Leader by the National Academy of Medicine in 2020.

Obermeyer's racial bias study received the Willard G. Manning Memorial Award for the Best Research in Health Econometrics from the American Society of Health Economists (ASHEcon) in 2021 and the Responsible Business Education Award from the Financial Times in 2022.
