= Accumulated local effects =

Machine learning method

Accumulated local effects (ALE) is a machine learning interpretability method.

== Concepts ==
ALE uses a conditional feature distribution as an input and generates augmented data, creating more realistic data than a marginal distribution.

It ignores far out-of-distribution (outlier) values. Unlike partial dependence plots and marginal plots, ALE is not defeated in the presence of correlated predictors.

It analyzes differences in predictions instead of averaging them by calculating the average of the differences in model predictions over the augmented data, instead of the average of the predictions themselves.

== Example ==
Given a model that predicts house prices based on its distance from city center and size of the building area, ALE compares the differences of predictions of houses of different sizes. The result separates the impact of the size from otherwise correlated features.

== Limitations ==
Defining evaluation windows is subjective. High correlations between features can defeat the technique. ALE requires more and more uniformly distributed observations than PDP so that the conditional distribution can be reliably determined. The technique may produce inadequate results if the data is highly sparse, which is more common with high-dimensional data (curse of dimensionality).

== See also ==
- Interpretability (machine learning)
