= Algorithmic transparency =

Transparency of decisions by algorithms

Algorithmic transparency is the principle that the factors that influence the decisions made by algorithms should be visible, or transparent, to the people who use, regulate, and are affected by systems that employ those algorithms. Although the phrase was coined in 2016 by Nicholas Diakopoulos and Michael Koliska about the role of algorithms in deciding the content of digital journalism services, the underlying principle dates back to the 1970s and the rise of automated systems for scoring consumer credit.

The phrases "algorithmic transparency" and "algorithmic accountability" are sometimes used interchangeably – especially since they were coined by the same people – but they have subtly different meanings. Specifically, "algorithmic transparency" states that the inputs to the algorithm and the algorithm's use itself must be known, but they need not be fair. "Algorithmic accountability" implies that the organizations that use algorithms must be accountable for the decisions made by those algorithms, even though the decisions are being made by a machine, and not by a human being.

Current research around algorithmic transparency interested in both societal effects of accessing remote services running algorithms, as well as mathematical and computer science approaches that can be used to achieve algorithmic transparency. In the United States, the Federal Trade Commission's Bureau of Consumer Protection studies how algorithms are used by consumers by conducting its own research on algorithmic transparency and by funding external research. In the European Union, the data protection laws that came into effect in May 2018 include a "right to explanation" of decisions made by algorithms, though it is unclear what this means. Furthermore, the European Union founded The European Center for Algorithmic Transparency (ECAT).

== See also ==
- Algorithmic accountability
- Black box
- Explainable AI
- Regulation of algorithms
- Reverse engineering
- Right to explanation
