= Social Science One =

Academic Organization

Social Science One is an academic organization based at Harvard University, co-chaired by Gary King and Ken Benoit. The organization was founded by Facebook in 2018 to study models of collaboration between industry and academia. A pilot collaboration with Facebook launched in April 2018 to study the relationship between social media and elections. In 2021, Social Science One established a consortium of social science research institutes to study and reduce barriers to industry-academic partnership.

== History ==
The Social Science One partnership began in 2018, in the wake of the Facebook–Cambridge Analytica data scandal. At its launch, Vox reported that Facebook established Social Science One to prevent future events similar to the scandal and also as a public relations response to that problem. The partnership was announced by King, original co-chair Nathaniel Persily, and Elliot Schrage of Facebook. The partnership was supported by a coalition of seven foundations assembled by Larry Kramer, including the Democracy Fund, the Hewlett Foundation, the Knight Foundation, the Charles Koch Foundation and the Omidyar Network.

Social Science One, Facebook and affiliated academics have frequently discussed the unanticipated difficulty of obtaining the datasets originally planned and the attendant delay in data availability. The datasets required new legal agreements, administrative frameworks, and organizational relationships. In addition, the project required the use of new privacy protections, including differential privacy techniques that had yet to be developed.

On December 11, 2019, addressing the delayed availability of data the Co-Chairs and European Advisory Committee of Social Science One made a public statement "The current situation is untenable. Heated public and political discussions are waged over the role and responsibilities of platforms in today’s societies, and yet researchers cannot make fully informed contributions to these discussions. We are mostly left in the dark, lacking appropriate data to assess potential risks and benefits. This is not an acceptable situation for scientific knowledge. It is not an acceptable situation for our societies".

== Data and applications ==
In 2020, Social Science One and Facebook released a URL Shares dataset. The dataset, about one petabyte in size, containing almost all public URLs shared and clicked by Facebook users globally, and metadata such as Facebook likes, ideological, and fact checking information.

Social Science One and the Social Science Research Council launched and administered a series of requests for proposals for this dataset, which are ongoing. Twelve research projects using this dataset were announced in 2019, focusing on the impact of social media on elections and democracy.

Since the release of the URL dataset, Social Science One has expanded its mandate to encompass industry-academic collaboration at large, creating a new consortium of social science research centers to study the topic. In addition, the organization is facilitating a partnership between Harvard University researchers and Microsoft to develop differential privacy algorithms.

== Controversy ==
In August 2019 BuzzFeed noted that Social Science One had not fulfilled its commitment to share the data it promised 16 months earlier. Democracy Fund, the William and Flora Hewlett Foundation, the John S. and James L. Knight Foundation, the Charles Koch Foundation and Omidyar Network gave Facebook deadline to share data and threatened to pull out of the project because of the delay.
