= Nani Jansen Reventlow =

Human rights lawyer (born 1978)

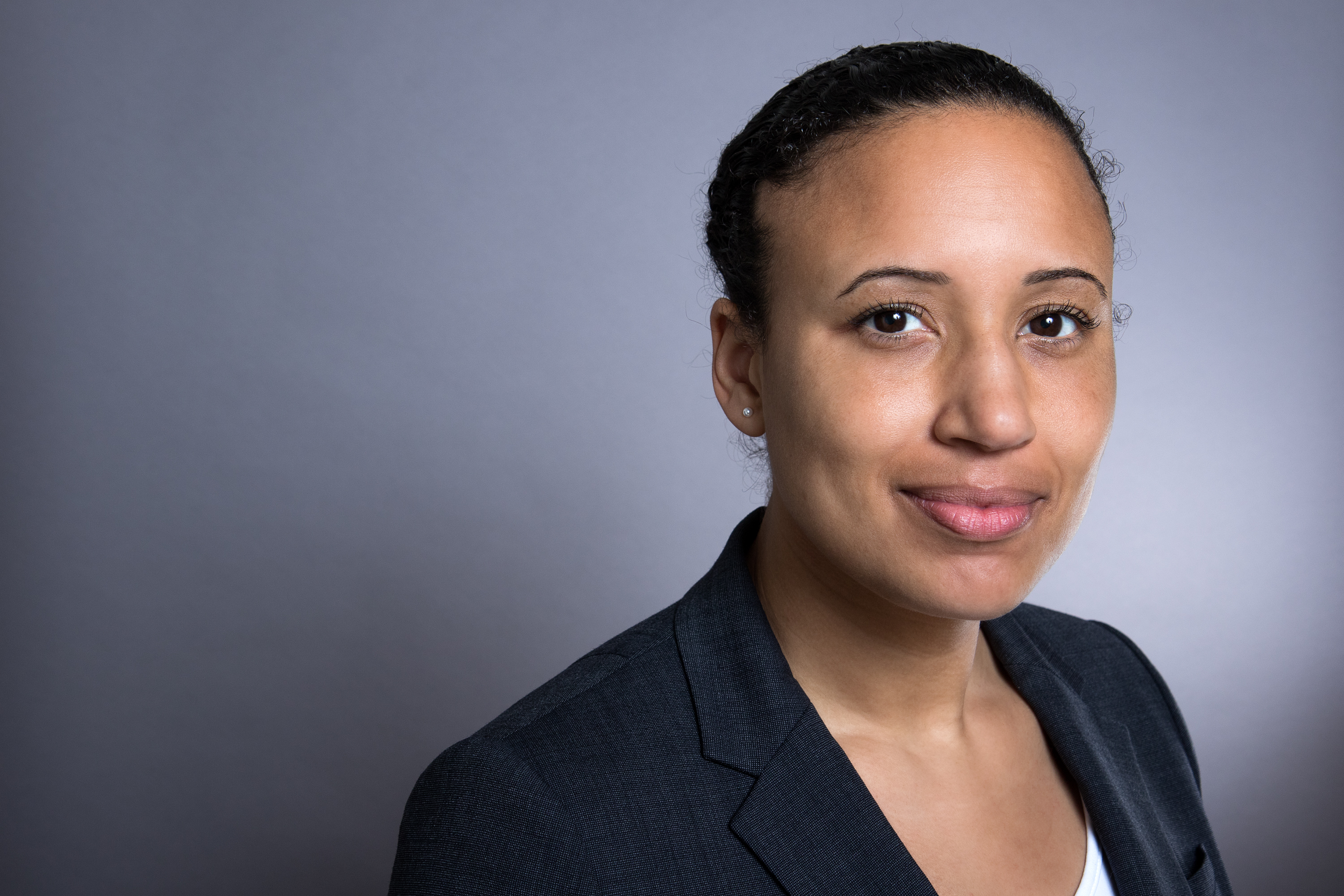
- Born: Yakaré-Oulé Jansen Reventlow; July 29, 1978 (age 48)
- Education: Columbia University School of Law (LL.M.); University of Amsterdam School of Law (J.D.)
- Occupation: Human rights lawyer
- Website: nanijansen.org

Yakaré-Oulé "Nani" Jansen Reventlow is a human rights lawyer who specialises in strategic litigation at the intersection of human rights, social justice, and technology. She is the founding director of Systemic Justice, which works to radically transform how the law works for communities fighting for racial, social, and economic justice. She previously founded and built Digital Freedom Fund, which advances digital rights in Europe through strategic litigation.

She is an associate professor at the Blavatnik School of Government at the University of Oxford, an "Associate Tenant" at Doughty Street Chambers, and previously a lecturer in law at Columbia Law School. She is the recipient of various awards and honours, including Harvard Law School's "Women Inspiring Change" in 2020, and Oxford Internet Institute's Internet and Society award in 2018.

== Education and career ==
Jansen Reventlow earned a JD/LLB in Dutch Civil Law and International and European Law at the University of Amsterdam and an LLM in Human Rights at Columbia University School of Law.

Throughout her career, Jansen Reventlow has been responsible for several notable freedom of expression cases across national and international jurisdictions, including the first freedom of expression judgment from the African Court on Human and Peoples’ Rights and from the East African Court of Justice.

From 2011 to 2016, she oversaw litigation practice at Media Legal Defence Initiative (MLDI), leading or advising in cases involving over 50 national jurisdictions and international forums such as the European Court of Human Rights, the Inter-American Court of Human Rights, the UN Human Rights Committee, and the UN Working Group on Arbitrary Detention.

Her standard-setting work seeking to decolonise the digital rights field in Europe saw her listed on Politico’s 2021 list of visionary tech leaders in Europe.

In June 2020 Nani Jansen Reventlow was one of the four candidates for the position of UN Special Rapporteur on the Promotion and Protection of the Right to Freedom of Opinion and Expression. Other candidates were Irene Khan, Fatou Jagne Senghore and Agustina del Campo.

== Radical justice: Building the world we need ==
In 2024, Jansen Reventlow published a collection of essays in the book Radicale rechtvaardigheid (Radical Justice). Published in Jansen Reventlow's native Dutch by the publisher Murrow, the book outlines how we can start building a fundamentally different future – one where everyone is genuinely free and equal, with equal opportunities to thrive. In Radicale rechtvaardigheid, Jansen Reventlow is inspired by prominent thinkers in anti-racism and social justice, and draws from her extensive professional experience as an international human rights lawyer. The book was positively received by the Dutch press.

== Awards and honours ==
Jansen Reventlow has received multiple awards and honours, including:

- ISOC Netherlands "Lifetime Achievement Award" (2024)
- Berkeley Law's "Stefan A. Riesenfeld Memorial Award" (2021)
- Bits of Freedom's "Felipe Rodriguez Award" (2021)
- Harvard Law School's "Women Inspiring Change" honouree (2020)
- Oxford Internet Institute Internet & Society Award (2018)
- Law Society's Excellence Award for Human Rights Lawyer of the Year (shortlist 2015)
- Columbia University Global Freedom of Expression Prize for Excellence in Legal Services (2015)
