= Loi pour une République numérique =

French law

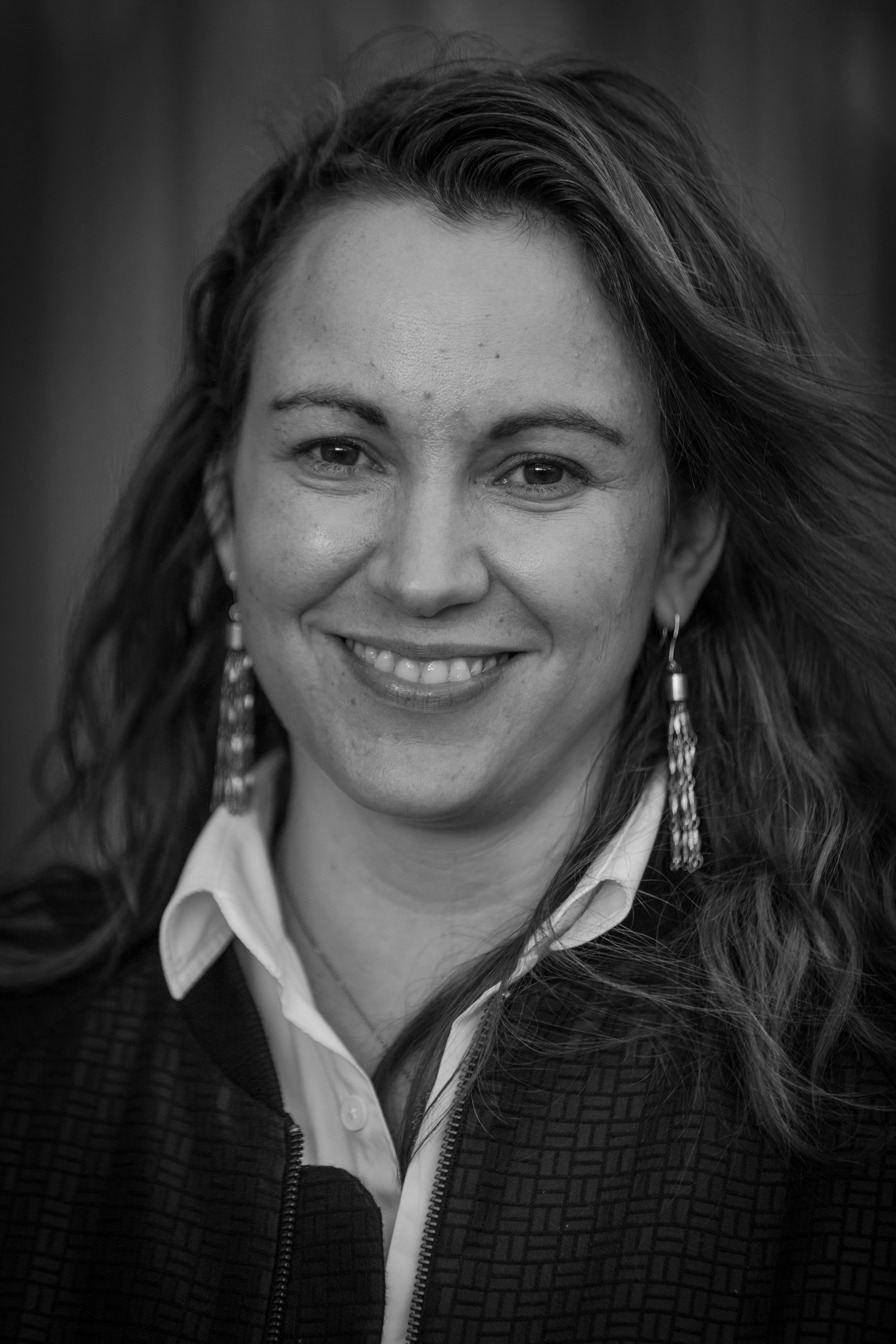
Axelle Lemaire, proposer of the law

The loi pour une République numérique (abr. loi numérique) is a French law first proposed by Axelle Lemaire, Secretary of State for Digital Affairs, voted on 7 October 2016.

This law aims to fulfill a two-fold purpose : "to give France a head start in the digital field by promoting an open data and knowledge policy" and to "adopt a progressive digital approach, based on individuals, to strengthen their power to act and their rights in the digital world". To do so, the law is organized around three lines: the circulation of data and knowledge, the protection of individuals in the digital society and access to digital for all.

The discussion began with an online public consultation, until 18 October 2015, then, enriched with some proposals from Internet users, the law was debated and voted in the National Assembly from 19 to 26 January 2016. It follows the "Digital Ambition" consultation led by Benoit Thieulin and Yann Bonnet, as part of the work of the National Digital Council.

It's a major IT law. It supersedes the Loi pour la confiance dans l'économie numérique (Confidence in the Digital Economy Act) of 2004.

== Themes ==
The bill voted by MEPs at first reading introduces in particular the default opening of public data, net neutrality, an obligation of loyalty for online platforms, as well as increased protection for the personal data of Internet users. The law for a digital Republic also provides the conditions of an Internet accessible to the greatest number, through the acceleration of the coverage of the territory in very high bandwidth and in mobile telecommunications, measures for a better access of people with disabilities to online services, and the creation of a right to the continuation of the Internet connection in case of unpaid bills for households in difficulty.

=== Accessibility ===
Measures to promote accessibility for people with disabilities on public service websites had been planned. However, they are now only recommended, with an obligation to inform if the site is accessible or not, which is criticized by the association "les aveugles de France", the collective "Pour une France accessible" and the association "Faire Face".

Telephone accessibility is enacted into law in article 105, requiring telecom carriers to provide VRS and Text relay services. Call centers for both large companies and for public services are also required to provide their own VRS and Text relay. This marks France's first official TRS services, with obligations enforced by the telecom regulator ARCEP.

=== Open Data and data portability ===
Included in the project is a default release of public data, and a recommendation for the use of interoperable formats.

=== Free Software and Open Formats ===
Article 16 of the law provides for the encouragement of the use of free software and open formats in public administration information systems, in order to preserve their control, durability and independence.

In addition, the law specifies that source codes are administrative documents that can be communicated and reused, under article 2 of the law. An implementing decree has been issued to specify the list of licenses, all of which are open source, applicable to the distribution of these source codes. A list of these source codes is published by Etalab.

=== Copyright issues ===
The definition of digital commons was discussed, with great interest during the online consultation, then withdrawn by Matignon. The cabinet of Fleur Pellerin, then Minister of Culture, is against it. Isabelle Attard condemned Matignon's withdrawal of the Commons, then submitted an amendment in favour of the Commons, which was rejected.

Freedom of panorama has also been debated, but the potential commercial use of images is likely to be a problem. A compromise amendment has been accepted, but does not satisfy all the demands of those in favour of freedom of panorama, in particular because it only allows strictly non-commercial use, which is difficult to define on the Internet.

=== Open access ===
The law promotes open access to scientific publications at no cost. Research publications funded at least 50% by public funds can be made available free of charge after an embargo period: article 30 makes self-archiving possible for all authors after 6 or 12 months from the publication (if publicly funded).

This right of the authors is non-waivable, so any contractual provision to the contrary is superseded, even for articles published before 2016, as the law is meant to encourage green open access irrespective of academic publishers' policies.

=== Digital access for all ===
A proposal was also adopted to guarantee a right to the Internet for all, even if limited, allowing access to electronic mail or online public services. Network operators will be encouraged to develop their investments where the needs are greatest, through the prolongation and extension of the scope of over-damping to the deployment of fibre in rural areas.

=== Sovereign Operating System ===
An amendment in favour of a sovereign OS was also adopted, which provoked rather negative reactions, notably from ANSSI, due to the possible lack of realism of the proposal and of already existing solutions, such as the secure operating system CLIP, based on Linux.

=== Privacy ===
The CNIL's power would be strengthened, in the event of a recurrence, to reach 4% of turnover or 20 million euros. Amendments in favour of the right to be forgotten for minors and the closure of the online accounts of deceased persons were also approved. Group actions against companies that do not respect privacy are also planned.

=== Digital death ===
Article 63 of the Law incorporates the concept of digital death to define what becomes of a person's digital data upon death. The principles of data protection provided in the Data Protection, Files and Freedoms Act become obsolete. But the Law gives the possibility of defining directives relating to the conservation, erasure and communication of personal data after his death, failing which, it is the legal heirs who may act on these digital data.

=== Digital trade issues ===
In January 2016, the National Assembly amended the bill with amendment No. 376, adding an article 23 bis and ter making anyone renting their property on a platform such as Airbnb without the written permission of its owner liable to imprisonment, heavy fines and even eviction from their home. The amendment was defended by PS member Sandrine Mazetier.

In addition, the Senate proposes that income earned on online sales platforms would be automatically declared to the tax authorities.

=== Video game competitions ===
In January 2016, Prime Minister Manuel Valls entrusted two MPs, Rudy Salles and Jérôme Durain, with the task of "defining a legislative and regulatory framework to promote the development of video game competitions in France" to the French Secretary of State for Digital Affairs and Innovation, Axelle Lemaire. The report submitted in March 2016 by the two parliamentarians led to participation in the bill for a digital Republic, which in its chapter 4 section 2 recognizes the practice of video games in competition in France, as well as an official status for professional players.

== Reactions and critics ==
=== Online consultation ===
This bill is the first to have been preceded by an online consultation:

- an initial consultation organised by the Conseil national du numérique which identified certain subjects to be included in the law (portability, open data..)
- a second consultation organised by the government on the text of the bill.

=== A project deemed insufficient ===
The LR group in the National Assembly criticised "a coherent but unfortunately very inadequate package", while the UDI group expressed concern about the digital divide. Environmentalists and the left front regretted the withdrawal of the information commons.

== See also ==
- Marco Civil da Internet, Brazilian digital law voted in 2014
- Libre accès
- Neutralité du réseau
- Biens communs numériques
- Informatique de confiance
- Sécurité de l'information

== External links, to official documents ==
- Dossier législatif du Sénat
- Dossier législatif de l'Assemblée nationale
