= Regulation of algorithms =

Government regulation

Regulation of algorithms, or algorithmic regulation, is the creation of laws, rules and public sector policies for promotion and regulation of algorithms, particularly in artificial intelligence and machine learning. For the subset of AI algorithms, the term regulation of artificial intelligence is used. The regulatory and policy landscape for artificial intelligence (AI) is an emerging issue in jurisdictions globally, including in the European Union. Regulation of AI is considered necessary to both encourage AI and manage associated risks, but challenging. Another emerging topic is the regulation of blockchain algorithms (Use of the smart contracts must be regulated) and is mentioned along with regulation of AI algorithms. Many countries have enacted regulations of high frequency trades, which is shifting due to technological progress into the realm of AI algorithms.

The motivation for regulation of algorithms is the apprehension of losing control over the algorithms, whose impact on human life increases. Multiple countries have already introduced regulations in case of automated credit score calculation—right to explanation is mandatory for those algorithms. For example, The IEEE has begun developing a new standard to explicitly address ethical issues and the values of potential future users. Bias, transparency, and ethics concerns have emerged with respect to the use of algorithms in diverse domains ranging from criminal justice to healthcare—many fear that artificial intelligence could replicate existing social inequalities along race, class, gender, and sexuality lines.

== Regulation of artificial intelligence ==
=== Public discussion ===
In 2016, Joy Buolamwini founded Algorithmic Justice League after a personal experience with biased facial detection software in order to raise awareness of the social implications of artificial intelligence through art and research.

In 2017 Elon Musk advocated regulation of algorithms in the context of the existential risk from artificial general intelligence. According to NPR, the Tesla CEO was "clearly not thrilled" to be advocating for government scrutiny that could impact his own industry, but believed the risks of going completely without oversight are too high: "Normally the way regulations are set up is when a bunch of bad things happen, there's a public outcry, and after many years a regulatory agency is set up to regulate that industry. It takes forever. That, in the past, has been bad but not something which represented a fundamental risk to the existence of civilisation."

In response, some politicians expressed skepticism about the wisdom of regulating a technology that is still in development. Responding both to Musk and to February 2017 proposals by European Union lawmakers to regulate AI and robotics, Intel CEO Brian Krzanich has argued that artificial intelligence is in its infancy and that it is too early to regulate the technology. Instead of trying to regulate the technology itself, some scholars suggest to rather develop common norms including requirements for the testing and transparency of algorithms, possibly in combination with some form of warranty. One suggestion has been for the development of a global governance board to regulate AI development. In 2020, the European Union published its draft strategy paper for promoting and regulating AI.

Algorithmic tacit collusion is a legally dubious antitrust practise committed by means of algorithms, which the courts are not able to prosecute. This danger concerns scientists and regulators in EU, US and beyond. European Commissioner Margrethe Vestager mentioned an early example of algorithmic tacit collusion in her speech on "Algorithms and Collusion" on March 16, 2017, described as follows:

"A few years ago, two companies were selling a textbook called The Making of a Fly. One of those sellers used an algorithm which essentially matched its rival’s price. That rival had an algorithm which always set a price 27% higher than the first. The result was that prices kept spiralling upwards, until finally someone noticed what was going on, and adjusted the price manually. By that time, the book was selling – or rather, not selling – for 23 million dollars a copy."

In 2018, the Netherlands employed an algorithmic system SyRI (Systeem Risico Indicatie) to detect citizens perceived being high risk for committing welfare fraud, which quietly flagged thousands of people to investigators. This caused a public protest. The district court of Hague shut down SyRI referencing Article 8 of the European Convention on Human Rights (ECHR).

In 2020, algorithms assigning exam grades to students in the UK sparked open protest under the banner "Fuck the algorithm." This protest was successful and the grades were taken back.

In 2024, the Munich Convention on AI, Data and Human Rights was introduced as part of growing international efforts to regulate artificial intelligence through a human rights lens. Developed through a collaborative drafting process involving scholars from the Technical University of Munich, Stellenbosch University, Ulster University, and KNUST, the initiative calls for an international conversation on a binding treaty to safeguard human rights and the principles enshrined in the UN Charter in the age of AI.

=== Implementation ===
AI law and regulations can be divided into three main topics, namely governance of autonomous intelligence systems, responsibility and accountability for the systems, and privacy and safety issues. The development of public sector strategies for management and regulation of AI has been increasingly deemed necessary at the local, national, and international levels and in fields from public service management to law enforcement, the financial sector, robotics, the military, and international law. There are many concerns that there is not enough visibility and monitoring of AI in these sectors. In the United States financial sector, for example, there have been calls for the Consumer Financial Protection Bureau to more closely examine source code and algorithms when conducting audits of financial institutions' non-public data.

In the United States, on January 7, 2019, following an Executive Order on 'Maintaining American Leadership in Artificial Intelligence', the White House's Office of Science and Technology Policy released a draft Guidance for Regulation of Artificial Intelligence Applications, which includes ten principles for United States agencies when deciding whether and how to regulate AI. In response, the National Institute of Standards and Technology has released a position paper, the National Security Commission on Artificial Intelligence has published an interim report, and the Defense Innovation Board has issued recommendations on the ethical use of AI.

In April 2016, for the first time in more than two decades, the European Parliament adopted a set of comprehensive regulations for the collection, storage, and use of personal information, the General Data Protection Regulation (GDPR)1 (European Union, Parliament and Council 2016). The GDPR's policy on the right of citizens to receive an explanation for algorithmic decisions highlights the pressing importance of human interpretability in algorithm design.

In 2016, China published a position paper questioning the adequacy of existing international law to address the eventuality of fully autonomous weapons, becoming the first permanent member of the U.N. Security Council to broach the issue, and leading to proposals for global regulation. In the United States, steering on regulating security-related AI is provided by the National Security Commission on Artificial Intelligence.

In 2017, the U.K. Vehicle Technology and Aviation Bill imposes liability on the owner of an uninsured automated vehicle when driving itself and makes provisions for cases where the owner has made "unauthorized alterations" to the vehicle or failed to update its software. Further ethical issues arise when, e.g., a self-driving car swerves to avoid a pedestrian and causes a fatal accident.

In 2021, the European Commission proposed the Artificial Intelligence Act.

== Algorithm certification ==
There is a concept of algorithm certification emerging as a method of regulating algorithms. Algorithm certification involves auditing whether the algorithm used during the life cycle 1) conforms to the protocoled requirements (e.g., for correctness, completeness, consistency, and accuracy); 2) satisfies the standards, practices, and conventions; and 3) solves the right problem (e.g., correctly model physical laws), and satisfies the intended use and user needs in the operational environment.

== Regulation of blockchain algorithms ==
Blockchain systems provide transparent and fixed records of transactions and hereby contradict the goal of the European GDPR, which is to give individuals full control of their private data.

By implementing the Decree on Development of Digital Economy, Belarus has become the first-ever country to legalize smart contracts. Belarusian lawyer Denis Aleinikov is considered to be the author of a smart contract legal concept introduced by the decree. There are strong arguments that the existing US state laws are already a sound basis for the smart contracts' enforceability—Arizona, Nevada, Ohio and Tennessee have amended their laws specifically to allow for the enforceability of blockchain-based contracts nevertheless.

== Regulation of robots and autonomous algorithms ==
There have been proposals to regulate robots and autonomous algorithms. These include:

- the South Korean Government's proposal in 2007 of a Robot Ethics Charter;
- a 2011 proposal from the U.K. Engineering and Physical Sciences Research Council of five ethical "principles for designers, builders, and users of robots";
- the Association for Computing Machinery's seven principles for algorithmic transparency and accountability, published in 2017.

== In popular culture ==
In 1942, author Isaac Asimov addressed regulation of algorithms by introducing the fictional Three Laws of Robotics:

1. A robot may not injure a human being or, through inaction, allow a human being to come to harm.
2. A robot must obey the orders given it by human beings except where such orders would conflict with the First Law.
3. A robot must protect its own existence as long as such protection does not conflict with the First or Second Laws.

The main alternative to regulation is a ban, and the banning of algorithms is presently highly unlikely. However, in Frank Herbert's Dune universe, thinking machines is a collective term for artificial intelligence, which were completely destroyed and banned after a revolt known as the Butlerian Jihad:

JIHAD, BUTLERIAN: (see also Great Revolt) — the crusade against computers, thinking machines, and conscious robots begun in 201 B.G. and concluded in 108 B.G. Its chief commandment remains in the O.C. Bible as "Thou shalt not make a machine in the likeness of a human mind."

== See also ==
- Algorithmic transparency
- Algorithmic accountability
- Artificial intelligence
- Artificial intelligence arms race
- Artificial intelligence in government
- Ethics of artificial intelligence
- Government by algorithm
- Privacy law
