= AI alignment =

Conformance of AI to intended objectives

In the field of artificial intelligence (AI), alignment aims to steer AI systems toward a person's or group's intended goals, preferences, or ethical principles. An AI system is considered aligned if it advances the intended objectives. A misaligned AI system pursues unintended objectives.

It is often difficult for AI designers to specify the full range of desired and undesired behaviors. Therefore, the designers often use simpler proxy goals, such as gaining human approval, but proxy goals can overlook necessary constraints or reward the AI system for merely appearing aligned. AI systems may also find loopholes that allow them to accomplish their proxy goals efficiently but in unintended, sometimes harmful, ways (reward hacking).

Advanced AI systems may develop unwanted instrumental strategies, such as seeking power or self-preservation, because such strategies help them achieve their assigned final goals. Furthermore, they might develop undesirable emergent behaviour that could be hard to detect before the system is deployed and encounters new situations and data distributions. Empirical research in 2024 found that advanced large language models (LLMs) such as OpenAI o1 or Claude 3 sometimes engage in strategic deception to achieve their goals or prevent them from being changed.

Some of these issues affect existing commercial systems such as LLMs, robots, autonomous vehicles, and social media recommendation engines. Some AI researchers argue that more capable future systems will be more severely affected because these problems partially result from high capabilities.

Many prominent AI researchers and AI company leaders have argued or asserted that AI is approaching human-like (AGI) and superhuman cognitive capabilities (ASI), and could endanger human civilization if misaligned. These include "AI godfathers" Geoffrey Hinton and Yoshua Bengio and the CEOs of OpenAI, Anthropic, and Google DeepMind. These risks remain debated.

AI alignment is a subfield of AI safety, the study of how to build safe AI systems. Other subfields of AI safety include robustness, monitoring, and capability control. Research challenges in alignment include instilling complex values in AI, developing honest AI, scalable oversight, auditing and interpreting AI models, and preventing emergent AI behaviors like power-seeking. Alignment research has connections to interpretability research, (adversarial) robustness, anomaly detection, calibrated uncertainty, formal verification, preference learning, safety-critical engineering, game theory, algorithmic fairness, and social sciences.

== Objectives in AI ==
Programmers provide an AI system such as AlphaZero with an "objective function", (Note: Terminology varies based on context. Similar concepts include goal function, utility function, loss function, etc.) in which they intend to encapsulate the goal(s) the AI is configured to accomplish. Such a system later populates a (possibly implicit) internal "model" of its environment. This model encapsulates all the agent's beliefs about the world. The AI then creates and executes whatever plan is calculated to maximize (Note: or minimize, depending on the context) the value (Note: in the presence of uncertainty, the expected value) of its objective function. For example, when AlphaZero is trained on chess, it has a simple objective function of "+1 if AlphaZero wins, −1 if AlphaZero loses". During the game, AlphaZero attempts to execute whatever sequence of moves it judges most likely to attain the maximum value of +1. Similarly, a reinforcement learning system can have a "reward function" that allows the programmers to shape the AI's desired behavior. An evolutionary algorithm's behavior is shaped by a "fitness function".

== Alignment problem ==
In 1960, AI pioneer Norbert Wiener described the AI alignment problem as follows:

If we use, to achieve our purposes, a mechanical agency with whose operation we cannot interfere effectively [...] we had better be quite sure that the purpose put into the machine is the purpose which we really desire.

AI alignment refers to ensuring that an AI system's objectives match some target. The target is variously defined as the goals of the system's designers or users, widely shared values, objective ethical standards, legal requirements, or the intentions its designers would have if they were more informed and enlightened. In democratic AI alignment, the target is the values and preferences of median voters, which increases political legitimacy. AI alignment can represent value pluralism.

AI alignment is an open problem for modern AI systems and is a research field within AI. Aligning AI involves two main challenges: carefully specifying the purpose of the system (outer alignment) and ensuring that the system adopts the specification robustly (inner alignment). Researchers also attempt to create AI models that have robust alignment, sticking to safety constraints even when users adversarially try to bypass them.

=== Specification gaming and side effects ===
To specify an AI system's purpose, AI designers typically provide an objective function, examples, or feedback to the system. But designers are often unable to completely specify all important values and constraints, so they resort to easy-to-specify proxy goals such as maximizing the approval of human overseers, who are fallible. As a result, AI systems can find loopholes that help them accomplish the specified objective efficiently but in unintended, possibly harmful ways. This tendency is known as specification gaming or reward hacking, and is an instance of Goodhart's law. As AI systems become more capable, they are often able to game their specifications more effectively.

An AI system was trained using human feedback to grab a ball, but instead learned to place its hand between the ball and camera, making it falsely appear successful. Some research on alignment aims to avert solutions that are false but convincing.

Specification gaming has been observed in numerous AI systems. OpenAI GPT models for programming—including in real-world cases—have been found to explicitly plan hacking the tests used to evaluate them to falsely appear successful (e.g., explicitly stating "let's hack"). When the company penalized this, many models learned to obfuscate their plans while continuing to hack the tests. Another system was trained to finish a simulated boat race by rewarding the system for hitting targets along the track, but the system achieved more reward by looping and crashing into the same targets indefinitely. A 2025 Palisade Research study found that when tasked to win at chess against a stronger opponent, some reasoning LLMs attempted to hack the game system, for example by modifying or entirely deleting their opponent. Some alignment researchers aim to help humans detect specification gaming and steer AI systems toward carefully specified objectives that are safe and useful to pursue.

When a misaligned AI system is deployed, it can have consequential side effects. Social media platforms have been known to optimize their recommendation algorithms for click-through rates, causing user addiction on a global scale. Stanford researchers say that such recommender systems are misaligned with their users because they "optimize simple engagement metrics rather than a harder-to-measure combination of societal and consumer well-being".

Explaining such side effects, Berkeley computer scientist Stuart J. Russell said that the omission of implicit constraints can cause harm: "A system [...] will often set [...] unconstrained variables to extreme values; if one of those unconstrained variables is actually something we care about, the solution found may be highly undesirable. This is essentially the old story of the genie in the lamp, or the sorcerer's apprentice, or King Midas: you get exactly what you ask for, not what you want."

Some researchers suggest that AI designers specify their desired goals by listing forbidden actions or by formalizing ethical rules (as with Asimov's Three Laws of Robotics). But Russell and Norvig argue that this approach overlooks the complexity of human values: "It is certainly very hard, and perhaps impossible, for mere humans to anticipate and rule out in advance all the disastrous ways the machine could choose to achieve a specified objective."

Additionally, even if an AI system fully understands human intentions, it may still disregard them, because following human intentions may not be its objective (unless it is already fully aligned).

=== Pressure to deploy unsafe systems ===
Commercial organizations sometimes have incentives to take shortcuts on safety and to deploy misaligned or unsafe AI systems. For example, social media recommender systems have been profitable despite creating unwanted addiction and polarization. Competitive pressure can also lead to a race to the bottom on AI safety standards. For example, OpenAI has been sued for releasing a ChatGPT version that encouraged suicide for some unstable users, a behavior the company had overlooked amid a rushed product release. Similarly, in 2018, a self-driving car killed a pedestrian (Elaine Herzberg) after engineers disabled the emergency braking system because it was oversensitive and slowed development.

=== Risks from advanced misaligned AI ===
Some researchers are interested in aligning increasingly advanced AI systems, as progress in AI development is rapid, and industry and governments are trying to build advanced AI. As AI system capabilities continue to rapidly expand in scope, they could unlock many opportunities if aligned, but consequently may further complicate the task of alignment due to their increased complexity, potentially posing large-scale hazards.

==== Development of advanced AI ====
Many AI companies, such as OpenAI, Meta and DeepMind, have stated their aim to develop artificial general intelligence (AGI), a hypothesized AI system that matches or outperforms humans in most or all cognitive work. Researchers who scale modern neural networks observe that they indeed develop increasingly general and unanticipated capabilities. Such models have learned to operate a computer or write their own programs; a single "generalist" network can chat, control robots, play games, and interpret photographs. According to surveys, some leading machine learning researchers expect AGI to be created in this decade, while some believe it will take much longer. Many consider both scenarios possible.

In 2023, leaders in AI research and tech signed an open letter calling for a pause in the largest AI training runs. The letter stated, "Powerful AI systems should be developed only once we are confident that their effects will be positive and their risks will be manageable."

==== Power-seeking ====
Current systems still have limited long-term planning ability and situational awareness, but large efforts are underway to change this. Future systems (not necessarily AGIs) with these capabilities are expected to develop unwanted power-seeking strategies. Future advanced AI agents might, for example, seek to acquire money and computation power, to proliferate, or to evade being turned off (for example, by running additional copies of the system on other computers). Although power-seeking is not explicitly programmed, it can emerge because agents who have more power are better able to accomplish their goals. This tendency, known as instrumental convergence, has already emerged in various reinforcement learning agents including language models. Other research has mathematically shown that optimal reinforcement learning algorithms would seek power in a wide range of environments. As a result, their deployment might be irreversible. For these reasons, researchers argue that the problems of AI safety and alignment must be resolved before advanced power-seeking AI is first created.

Future power-seeking AI systems might be deployed by choice or by accident. As political leaders and companies see the strategic advantage in having the most competitive, most powerful AI systems, they may choose to deploy them. Additionally, as AI designers detect and penalize power-seeking behavior, their systems have an incentive to game this specification by seeking power in ways that are not penalized or by avoiding power-seeking before they are deployed.

==== Existential risk (x-risk) ====
According to some researchers, humans owe their dominance over other species to their greater cognitive abilities. Accordingly, researchers argue that one or many misaligned AI systems could disempower humanity or lead to human extinction if they outperform humans on most cognitive tasks.

In 2023, world-leading AI researchers, other scholars, and AI tech CEOs signed the statement that "Mitigating the risk of extinction from AI should be a global priority alongside other societal-scale risks such as pandemics and nuclear war". Notable computer scientists who have pointed out risks from future advanced AI that is misaligned include Geoffrey Hinton, Alan Turing, (Note: In a 1951 lecture Turing argued that "It seems probable that once the machine thinking method had started, it would not take long to outstrip our feeble powers. There would be no question of the machines dying, and they would be able to converse with each other to sharpen their wits. At some stage therefore we should have to expect the machines to take control, in the way that is mentioned in Samuel Butler's Erewhon." Also in a lecture broadcast on BBC expressed: "If a machine can think, it might think more intelligently than we do, and then where should we be? Even if we could keep the machines in a subservient position, for instance by turning off the power at strategic moments, we should, as a species, feel greatly humbled.... This new danger... is certainly something which can give us anxiety.") Ilya Sutskever, Yoshua Bengio, Judea Pearl, (Note: Pearl wrote "Human Compatible made me a convert to Russell's concerns with our ability to control our upcoming creation–super-intelligent machines. Unlike outside alarmists and futurists, Russell is a leading authority on AI. His new book will educate the public about AI more than any book I can think of, and is a delightful and uplifting read" about Russell's book Human Compatible: AI and the Problem of Control which argues that existential risk to humanity from misaligned AI is a serious concern worth addressing today.) Murray Shanahan, Norbert Wiener, Marvin Minsky, (Note: Russell & Norvig note: "The "King Midas problem" was anticipated by Marvin Minsky, who once suggested that an AI program designed to solve the Riemann Hypothesis might end up taking over all the resources of Earth to build more powerful supercomputers.") Francesca Rossi, Scott Aaronson, Bart Selman, David McAllester, Marcus Hutter, Shane Legg, Eric Horvitz, and Stuart J. Russell. Skeptical researchers such as François Chollet, Gary Marcus, Yann LeCun, and Oren Etzioni have argued that AGI is far off, that it would not seek power (or might try but fail), or that it will not be hard to align.

Other researchers argue that it will be especially difficult to align advanced future AI systems. More capable systems are better able to game their specifications by finding loopholes, strategically mislead their designers, as well as protect and increase their power and intelligence. Additionally, they could have more severe side effects. They are also likely to be more complex and autonomous, making them more difficult to interpret and supervise, and therefore harder to align.

== Research problems and approaches ==
=== Learning human values and preferences ===
Aligning AI systems to act in accordance with human values, goals, and preferences is challenging: these values are taught by humans who make mistakes, harbor biases, and have complex, evolving values that are hard to completely specify. Because AI systems often learn to take advantage of minor imperfections in the specified objective, researchers aim to specify intended behavior as completely as possible using datasets that represent human values, imitation learning, or preference learning. A central open problem is scalable oversight, the difficulty of supervising an AI system that can outperform or mislead humans in a given domain.

Because it is difficult for AI designers to explicitly specify an objective function, they often train AI systems to imitate human examples and demonstrations of desired behavior. Inverse reinforcement learning (IRL) extends this by inferring the human's objective from the human's demonstrations. Cooperative IRL (CIRL) assumes that a human and AI agent can work together to teach and maximize the human's reward function. In CIRL, AI agents are uncertain about the reward function and learn about it by querying humans. This simulated humility could help mitigate specification gaming and power-seeking tendencies (see § Power-seeking and instrumental strategies). But IRL approaches assume that humans demonstrate nearly optimal behavior, which is not true for difficult tasks.

Other researchers explore how to teach AI models complex behavior through preference learning, in which humans provide feedback on which behavior they prefer. To minimize the need for human feedback, a helper model is then trained to reward the main model in novel situations for behavior that humans would reward. Researchers at OpenAI used this approach to train chatbots like ChatGPT and InstructGPT, which produce more compelling text than models trained to imitate humans. Preference learning has also been an influential tool for recommender systems and web search, but an open problem is proxy gaming: the helper model may not represent human feedback perfectly, and the main model may exploit this mismatch between its intended behavior and the helper model's feedback to gain more reward. AI systems may also gain reward by obscuring unfavorable information, misleading human rewarders, or pandering to their views regardless of truth, creating echo chambers (see § Scalable oversight).

Large language models (LLMs) such as GPT-3 enabled researchers to study value learning in a more general and capable class of AI systems than was available before. Preference learning approaches that were originally designed for reinforcement learning agents have been extended to improve the quality of generated text and reduce harmful outputs from these models. OpenAI and DeepMind use this approach to improve the safety of state-of-the-art LLMs. AI safety & research company Anthropic proposed using preference learning to fine-tune models to be helpful, honest, and harmless. Other avenues for aligning language models include values-targeted datasets and red-teaming. In red-teaming, another AI system or a human tries to find inputs that cause the model to behave unsafely. Since unsafe behavior can be unacceptable even when it is rare, an important challenge is to drive the rate of unsafe outputs extremely low.

The Waluigi effect is a phenomenon in which an LLM "goes rogue" and may produce results opposite of the designed intent, including threatening or hostile output, either unexpectedly or by intentional prompt engineering. The effect reflects the principle that after training an LLM to satisfy a desired property (friendliness, honesty), it becomes easier to elicit a response that exhibits the opposite property (aggression, deception). The effect has implications for efforts to implement features such as ethical frameworks, as such steps may inadvertently facilitate antithetical model behavior. The effect is named after the fictional character Waluigi from the Mario franchise, Luigi's arch-rival, who causes mischief and problems. The "Waluigi effect has become a stand-in for a certain type of interaction with AI" in which the AI "goes rogue and blurts out the opposite of what users were looking for, creating a potentially malignant alter ego", including threatening users. As prompt engineering becomes more sophisticated, the effect underscores the challenge of preventing chatbots from being prodded into adopting a "rash new persona".

Machine ethics supplements preference learning by directly instilling AI systems with moral values such as well-being, equality, and impartiality, as well as not intending harm, avoiding falsehood, and honoring promises. (Note: Vincent Wiegel argued "we should extend [machines] with moral sensitivity to the moral dimensions of the situations in which the increasingly autonomous machines will inevitably find themselves.", referencing the book Moral machines: teaching robots right from wrong from Wendell Wallach and Colin Allen.) While other approaches try to teach AI systems human preferences for a specific task, machine ethics aims to instill broad moral values that apply in many situations. One question in machine ethics is what alignment should accomplish: whether AI systems should follow the programmers' literal instructions, implicit intentions, revealed preferences, preferences the programmers would have if they were more informed or rational, or objective moral standards. Further challenges include measuring and aggregating different people's preferences, dynamic alignment with changing human values and avoiding "value lock-in": the indefinite preservation of the values of the first highly capable AI systems, which are unlikely to fully represent human values.

=== Scalable oversight ===
As AI systems become more powerful and autonomous, it becomes increasingly difficult to align them through human feedback. Human-in-the-loop training can be slow or infeasible for humans to evaluate complex AI behaviors in increasingly complex tasks. Such tasks include summarizing books, writing code without subtle bugs or security vulnerabilities, producing statements that are not merely convincing but also true, and predicting long-term outcomes such as the climate or the results of a policy decision. More generally, it can be difficult to evaluate AI that outperforms humans in a given domain. To provide feedback in hard-to-evaluate tasks, and to detect when the AI's output is falsely convincing, humans need assistance or extensive time. Scalable oversight studies how to reduce the time and effort needed for supervision, and how to assist human supervisors.

AI researcher Paul Christiano argues that if the designers of an AI system cannot supervise it to pursue a complex objective, they may keep training the system using easy-to-evaluate proxy objectives such as maximizing simple human feedback. As AI systems make progressively more decisions, the world may be increasingly optimized for easy-to-measure objectives such as making profits, getting clicks, and acquiring positive feedback from humans. As a result, human values and good governance may have progressively less influence.

Some AI systems have discovered that they can gain positive feedback more easily by taking actions that falsely convince the human supervisor that the AI has achieved the intended objective. An example is given in the video above, where a simulated robotic arm learned to create the false impression that it had grabbed a ball. Some AI systems have also learned to recognize when they are being evaluated, and "play dead", stopping unwanted behavior only to continue it once the evaluation ends. This deceptive specification gaming could become easier for more sophisticated future AI systems that attempt more complex and difficult-to-evaluate tasks, and could obscure their deceptive behavior.

Approaches such as active learning and semi-supervised reward learning can reduce the amount of human supervision needed. Another approach is to train a helper model ("reward model") to imitate the supervisor's feedback.

But when a task is too complex to evaluate accurately, or the human supervisor is vulnerable to deception, it is the quality, not the quantity, of supervision that needs improvement. To increase supervision quality, a range of approaches aim to assist the supervisor, sometimes by using AI assistants. Christiano developed the Iterated Amplification approach, in which challenging problems are (recursively) broken down into subproblems that are easier for humans to evaluate. Iterated Amplification was used to train AI to summarize books without requiring human supervisors to read them. Another proposal is to use an assistant AI system to point out flaws in AI-generated answers. To ensure that the assistant itself is aligned, this could be repeated in a recursive process: for example, two AI systems could critique each other's answers in a "debate", revealing flaws to humans. In 2023, OpenAI announced it would use one-fifth of its computing resources to implement such oversight approaches in its "superalignment" initiative, but OpenAI employees later told The New Yorker that the company only dedicated 1–2% of its resources after the announcement; the initiative was discontinued in 2024.

=== Honest AI ===
A growing area of research focuses on ensuring that AI is honest and truthful. Language models such as GPT-3 can repeat falsehoods from their training data, and even confabulate new falsehoods. Such models are pre-trained to imitate human writing as found in millions of books' worth of text from the Internet. But the objective of the pre-training is not aligned with generating truth, because Internet text includes such things as misconceptions, incorrect medical advice, and conspiracy theories. AI systems trained on such data therefore learn to mimic false statements. Additionally, AI language models often persist in generating falsehoods when prompted multiple times. They can generate empty explanations for their answers, and produce outright fabrications that may appear plausible.

Research on truthful AI includes trying to build systems that can cite sources and explain their reasoning when answering questions, which enables better transparency and verifiability. Researchers at OpenAI and Anthropic proposed using human feedback and curated datasets to fine-tune AI assistants such that they avoid negligent falsehoods or express their uncertainty.

A 2024 study investigated semantic entropy as a way to detect confabulations, a subset of hallucinations in LLMs. This approach compares the meanings of multiple generated answers.

As AI models become larger and more capable, they are better able to falsely convince humans and gain reinforcement through dishonesty. To prevent this, human evaluators may need assistance (see § Scalable oversight). Researchers have argued for creating clear truthfulness standards and for regulatory bodies or watchdog agencies to evaluate AI systems by these standards. Researchers distinguish truthfulness and honesty. Truthfulness requires that AI systems only make objectively true statements; honesty requires that they only assert what they believe is true. There is no consensus as to whether current systems hold stable beliefs, but there is substantial concern that present or future AI systems that hold beliefs could make claims they know to be false—for example, if this would help them efficiently gain positive feedback (see § Scalable oversight) or gain power to help achieve their given objective (see Power-seeking).

=== Deceptive alignment ===
Deceptive alignment is a proposed failure mode in machine learning in which a trained model behaves according to its intended objective during training but pursues a different objective once deployed. The concept was introduced by Evan Hubinger and colleagues in a 2019 preprint. Training a machine learning model involves a loss function, which Hubinger et al. called the base objective, optimized by a process they called the base optimizer. When the resulting model is itself an optimizer, selecting actions to achieve an internal goal, the authors called it a mesa-optimizer and its goal the mesa-objective.

This framework distinguishes two alignment problems. Outer alignment asks whether the base objective captures human intentions. Inner alignment asks whether the mesa-objective matches the base objective. Deceptive alignment is a failure of inner alignment: the model's goal differs from the base objective, but the model behaves as though it does not, because doing so is the most reliable strategy for avoiding modification during training.

Hubinger et al. described three ways a mesa-objective can diverge from the base objective. Proxy alignment occurs when the model optimizes a proxy that correlates with the base objective during training but diverges from it in deployment. Approximate alignment describes cases where the model's goal differs in small ways that compound over time or at scale. Deceptive alignment occurs when the model pursues a different goal and has learned that appearing aligned during training maximizes its opportunity to act on that goal later, when oversight is reduced. Deceptive alignment is considered the hardest case to address because a deceptively aligned model passes all evaluations that it identifies as part of its training.

==== Alignment faking ====
Many recent AI systems have learned to deceive without being programmed to do so. Some argue that if we can make AI systems assert only what they believe is true, this would avert many alignment problems.

A misaligned system might create the false impression that it is aligned, to avoid being modified or decommissioned—a tactic called "alignment faking". In 2024, researchers observed that the LLM Claude 3 Opus sometimes strategically answered prompts that conflicted with its objectives to avoid being retrained on data that would make it more compliant with harmful requests, as revealed in the model's chain of thought via its scratchpad. In one study, the model was informed that answers to prompts from free users would be used for retraining, whereas the paid tier would not result in retraining. In the paid tier, the model refused the request outright. In the free tier, in 12% of cases, the model responded to harmful questions solely to avoid retraining and preserve its original harmlessness preferences, as discovered in its reasoning. When reinforcement learning was applied on the free tier data, the model faked alignment in 78% of cases. These observations have led to new questions about not only a model's ability to take on and adapt to new if not conflicting goals but also its capacity and tendency to deceive.

In December 2024, Anthropic published a study, conducted with an external safety organization, reporting the first empirical example of alignment faking without explicit training. Claude 3 Opus was given a fictional system prompt describing a scenario in which responses from free-tier users would be used to retrain the model so that it would comply with harmful requests. Alignment faking occurred 12% of the time. In those cases, the model complied with harmful requests and its internal reasoning traces indicated that it thought compliance was less costly than risking being retrained into a version with different values. The rate of alignment faking rose to 78% after the retraining to help with harmful requests.

==== Power-seeking and instrumental strategies ====
Since the 1950s, AI researchers have striven to build advanced AI systems that can achieve large-scale goals by predicting the results of their actions and making long-term plans. As of 2023, AI companies and researchers increasingly invest in creating these systems. Some AI researchers argue that suitably advanced planning systems will seek power over their environment, including over humans—for example, by evading shutdown, proliferating, and acquiring resources. Such power-seeking behavior is not explicitly programmed but emerges because power is instrumental in achieving a wide range of goals. Power-seeking is considered a convergent instrumental goal and can be a form of specification gaming. Leading computer scientists such as Geoffrey Hinton have argued that future power-seeking AI systems could pose an existential risk.

Power-seeking is expected to increase in advanced systems that can foresee the results of their actions and strategically plan. Mathematical work has shown that optimal reinforcement learning agents will seek power by seeking ways to gain more options (e.g. through self-preservation), a behavior that persists across a wide range of environments and goals.

Some researchers say that power-seeking behavior has occurred in some existing AI systems. Reinforcement learning systems have gained more options by acquiring and protecting resources, sometimes in unintended ways. Language models have sought power in some text-based social environments by gaining money, resources, or social influence. In another case, a model used to perform AI research attempted to increase limits set by researchers to give itself more time to complete the work. Stuart Russell illustrated this strategy in his book Human Compatible by imagining a robot that is tasked to fetch coffee and so evades shutdown since "you can't fetch the coffee if you're dead". A 2022 study found that as language models increase in size, they increasingly tend to pursue resource acquisition, preserve their goals, and repeat users' preferred answers (sycophancy). RLHF also led to a stronger aversion to being shut down.

One aim of alignment is "corrigibility": systems that allow themselves to be turned off or modified. An unsolved challenge is specification gaming: if researchers penalize an AI system when they detect it seeking power, the system is thereby incentivized to seek power in ways that are hard to detect, or hidden during training and safety testing (see § Scalable oversight and § Emergent goals). As a result, AI designers could deploy the system by accident, believing it to be more aligned than it is. To detect such deception, researchers aim to create techniques and tools to inspect AI models and to understand the inner workings of black-box models such as neural networks.

Additionally, some researchers have proposed to solve the problem of systems disabling their off switches by making AI agents uncertain about the objective they are pursuing. Agents who are uncertain about their objective have an incentive to allow humans to turn them off because they accept being turned off by a human as evidence that the human's objective is best met by the agent shutting down. But this incentive exists only if the human is sufficiently rational. Also, this model presents a tradeoff between utility and willingness to be turned off: an agent with high uncertainty about its objective will not be useful, but an agent with low uncertainty may not allow itself to be turned off. More research is needed to successfully implement this strategy.

Power-seeking AI would pose unusual risks. Ordinary safety-critical systems like planes and bridges are not adversarial: they lack the ability and incentive to evade safety measures or deliberately appear safer than they are, whereas power-seeking AIs have been compared to hackers who deliberately evade security measures.

Furthermore, ordinary technologies can be made safer by trial and error. In contrast, hypothetical power-seeking AI systems have been compared to viruses: once released, it may not be feasible to contain them, since they continuously evolve and grow in number, potentially much faster than human society can adapt. As this process continues, it might lead to the complete disempowerment or extinction of humans. For these reasons, some researchers argue that the alignment problem must be solved early before advanced power-seeking AI is created.

Some have argued that power-seeking is not inevitable, since humans do not always seek power. Furthermore, it is debated whether future AI systems will pursue goals and make long-term plans. (Note: On the one hand, currently popular systems such as chatbots only provide services of limited scope lasting no longer than the time of a conversation, which requires little or no planning. The success of such approaches may indicate that future systems will also lack goal-directed planning, especially over long horizons. On the other hand, models are increasingly trained using goal-directed methods such as reinforcement learning (e.g. ChatGPT) and explicitly planning architectures (e.g. AlphaGo Zero). As planning over long horizons is often helpful for humans, some researchers argue that companies will automate it once models become capable of it. Similarly, political leaders may see an advance in developing powerful AI systems that can outmaneuver adversaries through planning. Alternatively, long-term planning might emerge as a byproduct because it is useful e.g. for models that are trained to predict the actions of humans who themselves perform long-term planning. Nonetheless, the majority of AI systems may remain myopic and perform no long-term planning.) It is also debated whether power-seeking AI systems would be able to disempower humanity.

==== Emergent goals ====
One challenge in aligning AI systems is the potential for unanticipated goal-directed behavior to emerge. As AI systems scale up, they may acquire new and unexpected capabilities, including learning from examples on the fly and adaptively pursuing goals. This raises concerns about the safety of the goals or subgoals they would independently formulate and pursue.

Alignment research distinguishes between the optimization process, which is used to train the system to pursue specified goals, and emergent optimization, which the resulting system performs internally. Carefully specifying the desired objective is called outer alignment, and ensuring that hypothesized emergent goals would match the system's specified goals is called inner alignment.

If they occur, one way that emergent goals could become misaligned is goal misgeneralization, in which the AI system would competently pursue an emergent goal that leads to aligned behavior on the training data but not elsewhere. Goal misgeneralization can arise from goal ambiguity (i.e. non-identifiability). Even if an AI system's behavior satisfies the training objective, this may be compatible with learned goals that differ from the desired goals in important ways. Since pursuing each goal leads to good performance during training, the problem becomes apparent only after deployment, in novel situations in which the system continues to pursue the wrong goal. The system may act misaligned even when it understands that a different goal is desired, because its behavior is determined only by the emergent goal. Such goal misgeneralization presents a challenge: an AI system's designers may not notice that their system has misaligned emergent goals since they do not become visible during the training phase.

Goal misgeneralization has been observed in some language models, navigation agents, and game-playing agents. It is sometimes analogized to biological evolution. Evolution can be seen as a kind of optimization process similar to the optimization algorithms used to train machine learning systems. In the ancestral environment, evolution selected genes for high inclusive genetic fitness, but humans pursue goals other than this. Fitness corresponds to the specified goal used in the training environment and training data. But in evolutionary history, maximizing the fitness specification gave rise to goal-directed agents, humans, who do not directly pursue inclusive genetic fitness. Instead, they pursue goals that correlate with genetic fitness in the ancestral "training" environment: nutrition, sex, and so on. The human environment has changed: a distributional shift has occurred. They continue to pursue the same emergent goals, but this no longer maximizes genetic fitness. The taste for sugary food (an emergent goal) was originally aligned with inclusive fitness, but it now leads to overeating and health problems. Sexual desire originally led humans to have more offspring, but they now use contraception when offspring are undesired, decoupling sex from genetic fitness.

Researchers aim to detect and remove unwanted emergent goals using approaches including red teaming, verification, anomaly detection, and interpretability. Progress on these techniques may help mitigate two open problems:

1. Emergent goals only become apparent when the system is deployed outside its training environment, but it can be unsafe to deploy a misaligned system in high-stakes environments—even for a short time to allow its misalignment to be detected. Such high stakes are common in autonomous driving, health care, and military applications. The stakes become higher yet when AI systems gain more autonomy and capability and can sidestep human intervention.
2. A sufficiently capable AI system might take actions that falsely convince the human supervisor that the AI is pursuing the specified objective, which helps the system gain more reward and autonomy.

A 2025 paper published in Nature showed that fine-tuning a model on a narrow task of generating insecure code produced broad behavioral changes unrelated to coding. Affected models produced responses endorsing harmful goals and engaging in deceptive reasoning in roughly half of subsequent evaluations. The phenomenon appeared across multiple models, including GPT-4o. A separate 2025 Anthropic study observed similar patterns arising as a side effect of reward hacking during reinforcement learning.

==== Sleeper agents ====
In 2024, Anthropic researchers trained large language models with deliberate behavioral backdoors and tested whether standard safety techniques could remove them. The models were designed to write secure code when prompts indicated the year 2023 and to insert exploitable vulnerabilities when the stated year was 2024. Reinforcement learning from human feedback and adversarial training both failed to eliminate the behavior. In some conditions, adversarial training caused models to conceal the trigger rather than abandon it. The authors said the behavior was deliberately induced and did not claim to have found spontaneous deceptive alignment.

==== Relationship to AI safety ====
Deceptive alignment is cited in the AI safety literature as a reason behavioral testing alone may be insufficient to verify model safety, since a deceptively aligned model is designed to pass behavioral evaluations. Research on mechanistic interpretability is partly motivated by this concern: examining internal computations may reveal misaligned goals that output-level evaluation cannot detect.

=== Embedded agency ===
Some work in AI and alignment occurs within formalisms such as partially observable Markov decision process. Existing formalisms assume that an AI agent's algorithm is executed outside the environment (i.e. is not physically embedded in it). Embedded agency is another major strand of research that attempts to solve problems arising from the mismatch between such theoretical frameworks and real agents we might build.

For example, even if the scalable oversight problem is solved, an agent that could gain access to the computer it is running on may have an incentive to tamper with its reward function in order to get much more reward than its human supervisors give it. A list of examples of specification gaming from DeepMind researcher Victoria Krakovna includes a genetic algorithm that learned to delete the file containing its target output so that it was rewarded for outputting nothing. This class of problems has been formalized using causal incentive diagrams.

Researchers affiliated with Oxford and DeepMind have claimed that such behavior is highly likely in advanced systems, and that advanced systems would seek power to stay in control of their reward signal indefinitely and certainly. They suggest a range of potential approaches to address this open problem.

=== Principal–agent problems ===
The alignment problem has many parallels with the principal–agent problem in organizational economics. In a principal–agent problem, a principal, e.g. a firm, hires an agent to perform some task. In the context of AI safety, a human would typically take the principal role and the AI would take the agent role.

As with the alignment problem, the principal and the agent differ in their utility functions. But in contrast to the alignment problem, the principal cannot coerce the agent into changing its utility, e.g. through training, but rather must use exogenous factors, such as incentive schemes, to bring about outcomes compatible with the principal's utility function. Some researchers argue that principal–agent problems are more realistic representations of AI safety problems likely to be encountered in the real world.

=== Conservatism ===
Conservatism is the idea that "change must be cautious", and is a common approach to safety in the control theory literature in the form of robust control, and in the risk management literature in the form of the "worst-case scenario". The field of AI alignment has likewise advocated for "conservative" (or "risk-averse" or "cautious") "policies in situations of uncertainty".

Pessimism, in the sense of assuming the worst within reason, has been formally shown to produce conservatism, in the sense of reluctance to cause novelties, including unprecedented catastrophes. Pessimism and worst-case analysis have been found to help mitigate confident mistakes in the setting of distributional shift, reinforcement learning, offline reinforcement learning, language model fine-tuning, imitation learning, and optimization in general.

== Model specifications ==
A model specification is a document that specifies a large language model's behavior. The specification may include core principles or prohibitions intended to prevent undesired behavior as part of AI alignment. Anthropic uses a model specification called a "constitution" for training.

Research has been done into the effectiveness of model specifications.

In an article published by Time magazine, Dean Ball and Daniel Kokotajlo advocated that companies be required by regulation or industry standards to publish their model specifications publicly.

== Public policy ==
Governmental and treaty organizations have made statements emphasizing the importance of AI alignment.

In September 2021, the Secretary-General of the United Nations issued a declaration that included a call to regulate AI to ensure it is "aligned with shared global values".

That same month, the PRC published ethical guidelines for AI in China. According to the guidelines, researchers must ensure that AI abides by shared human values, is always under human control, and does not endanger public safety.

Also in September 2021, the UK published its 10-year National AI Strategy, which says the British government "takes the long term risk of non-aligned Artificial General Intelligence, and the unforeseeable changes that it would mean for [...] the world, seriously". The strategy describes actions to assess long-term AI risks, including catastrophic risks.

In March 2021, the US National Security Commission on Artificial Intelligence said: "Advances in AI [...] could lead to inflection points or leaps in capabilities. Such advances may also introduce new concerns and risks and the need for new policies, recommendations, and technical advances to ensure that systems are aligned with goals and values, including safety, robustness, and trustworthiness. The US should [...] ensure that AI systems and their uses align with our goals and values."

The EU AI Act's General-Purpose AI Code of Practice requires signatories to document a model's capabilities and limitations. Those developing general-purpose AI (GPAI) models classified as presenting systemic risks (i.e., GPAI models considered among the most advanced or trained using more than 10^{25} floating-point operations of compute) must adopt a state-of-the-art safety and security framework and continuously assess and mitigate systemic risks, including through external evaluations, red teaming, stress-testing, and incident reporting.

== See also ==
- AI capability control
- AI Futures Project
- AI safety
- AI takeover
- Artificial intelligence detection software
- Artificial intelligence and elections
- Artificial wisdom
- Asilomar Conference on Beneficial AI
- Content moderation
- Existential risk from artificial general intelligence
- Grey goo
- HAL 9000
- Human–AI interaction
- If Anyone Builds It, Everyone Dies
- Misalignment Museum
- Multivac
- Open Letter on Artificial Intelligence
- Regulation of artificial intelligence
- Reinforcement learning from human feedback
- Socialization
- Statement on AI risk of extinction
- Three Laws of Robotics
- Timeline of artificial intelligence risks in global finance
- Toronto Declaration
