= Marco Camisani Calzolari =

Italian-British academic

- Born: March 1969 (age 57); Milan, Italy
- Citizenship: Italy
- Occupations: university professor, author, and television personality
- Awards: Knight of the Italian Republic

Marco Camisani Calzolari (born March 1969) is an Italian British university professor, author, and television personality specializing in digital communications, transformation, and artificial intelligence. He advises the Italian government and police on ethical AI and digital safety and hosts the digital segment of the Italian news show Striscia la Notizia. His research gained international attention in 2012 after creating an algorithm claiming to identify real Twitter users from fake users of bots.

Marco Camisani Calzolari was awarded as an Honorary Police Officer by the Italian State Police and the Knight of the Italian Republic.

== Biography ==
Camisani Calzolari was born in Milan, Italy where he began his television career, hosting on local provider LA7 in (2001). In 2008 Camisani Calzolari moved to the UK where he founded multiple digital start-ups. He is now a naturalised British citizen and applied to become a "Freeman of the City" in June 2022.

In 2024, Marco Camisani Calzolari began serving as the Chair and Adjunct Professor of the elective course Cyber-Humanities within the Degree Programme in Medicine and Surgery at Università Vita-Salute S.Raffaele in Milan.

On the 14th of May 2024, Camisani Calzolari was awarded the Knight of the Italian Republic (Order of the Star of Italy).

In 2024, Marco Camisani Calzolari was awarded the title of Honorary Police Officer by the Italian State Police for his commitment to combating cybercrime and promoting digital security. He also received the Keynes Sraffa Award 2024 from the Italian Chamber of Commerce and Industry for the UK. Additionally, he was honored with the University Seal by Università degli Studi della Tuscia (Viterbo) for his efforts in disseminating knowledge both in Italy and abroad.

== Academic career ==
Camisani Calzolari began his academic career at the Università Statale di Milano in 2007, until chairing a course on Corporate Communication and Digital Languages at the IULM University of Milan between 2007 and 2010. During this time Camisani Calzolari published his first written work under the title 'Impresa 4.0'.

After moving to London, Camisani Calzolari focussed on digital start-ups including 'Digitalevaluation ltd' where he would publish the results of his Twitter algorithm study. Following its publication, he accepted a role as Affiliate Practitioner at the Centre for Culture Media & Regulation (CCMR), University of Brunel London, and subsequently another role at a British University as Lecturer in Digital Communication at the LCA Business School.

Camisani Calzolari returned to Italy to lecture on Interactive Digital Communication at the University of Milan. From 2017 to 2023, he held various roles at the European University of Rome, including Adjunct Professor and Chair in Digital Communication, and published The Fake News Bible in 2018.

In 2024 he became the Scientific Coordinator for a Master's program at Università San Raffaele in Milan.

=== Twitter fake followers study ===
In 2012, Camisani Calzolari's research came into the focus of the public eye following the publication of his findings in a study analysing the followers of high-profile public figures and corporations. He developed a computer algorithm claiming to be able to distinguish real followers from computer-generated "bots". The algorithm compiled data correlative of human activity such as having a name, image, physical address, using punctuation and cross-account activity. Genuine Twitter users were considered to have written at least 50 posts and possessed over 30 followers themselves. The findings led to scrutiny of several individuals and corporations for allegedly purchasing followers.

=== Publications ===
Camisani Calzolari is best for known for his work in improving accessibility to digital and tech solutions for everyday business and personal use. His work in digital and communications has been included in several publications including: Cyberhumanism (2023) The Fake News Bible (2018), First Digital Aid for Business (2015), The Digital World (2013), Escape from Facebook (2012), Enterprise 4.0. Camisani Calzolari was also the subject of a University College London (UCL) case study titled Marco Camisani-Calzolari: the Digital Renaissance Man.

== Government work ==
Since 2023, he is a member of the Coordination Committee on Artificial Intelligence at the Presidency of the Council of Ministers and an advisor in Digital Skills and Designer of initiatives for the Department for Digital Transformation. He also serves as the official spokesperson for the State Police, educating the public on preventing digital threats, avoiding digital scams, and explaining criminal case.

Since August 2024, Marco Camisani Calzolari has served as an expert for the Italian Agency for the National Cybersecurity (ACN). In October of the same year, he also became a member of the General-Purpose AI Code of Practice working group for the European Commission.

== Television work ==
Camisani Calzolari hosts a digital segment for Striscia la Notizia, an Italian satirical television program on the Mediaset-controlled Canale 5.

He presented on weekly segments that include: RAI 1 – Digital First Aid (TV Program – 2014 to 2017) in the program "Uno Mattina" as a digital expert; RTL 102.5 – Technology Space (Radio Program – 2012 to 2017) in the morning news program as a digital expert (100 episodes from 2012 to 2017); DIGITALK Talkshow (2004) as host of Digitalk; Misterweb (TV Program – 2001 to 2002), he presented the TV program “MisterWeb”, on "LA7".

Marco Camisani Calzolari was a testimonial for several institutional communication campaigns by the Italian Department of Digital Transformation. These include initiatives promoting the Punti Digitale Facile, raising awareness about the NIS2 Directive for cybersecurity, and advocating for the adoption of the Electronic Identity Card (CIE).
