= Kokotajlo =

Kokotajlo is a surname. Notable people with the surname include:

- Daniel Kokotajlo, American AI researcher
- Daniel Kokotajlo (director), British film director

== See also ==
- Nicholas Kokotaylo (born 1955), British judoka
