= Digital Education Council =

Global higher education alliance

The Digital Education Council (DEC) is an organization of universities, colleges, and related parties focused on advocating for responsible artificial intelligence (AI) use in higher education. It is headquartered in Singapore.

== History ==
DEC was established in March 2024 with the stated purpose of providing a structured platform offering practical resources for universities, colleges and organisations to discuss AI governance, digital skills development, and policy frameworks for AI in education. Alessandro Di Lullo is the Chief Executive Officer and Danny Bielik is President.

== Activities ==
=== Digital Education Council Global Summit ===
DEC organises an annual summit of people in higher education, government, and industry. The inaugural Digital Education Council Global Summit was held in November 2024 at Singapore Management University. The programme included sessions on governance and AI in education, and keynote speaker Gabriele Mazzini, lead author of the European Union Artificial Intelligence Act.

The 2025 Digital Education Council Global Summit will be held at Hong Kong University of Science and Technology from 4 to 5 November 2025.

=== Research and Surveys ===
In 2024, DEC conducted a Global AI Student Survey about how students use generative AI tools. The findings indicated widespread use of platforms such as ChatGPT in academic settings. In 2025, DEC published a Global AI Faculty Survey of faculty members in 28 countries on topics including academic integrity, assessment, and institutional preparedness.

=== Executive Briefings ===
DEC provides monthly Executive Briefings on AI-related topics. The Financial Times cited one of DEC's briefings in its analysis of evolving cost structures in online business education.
