= Digitalk =

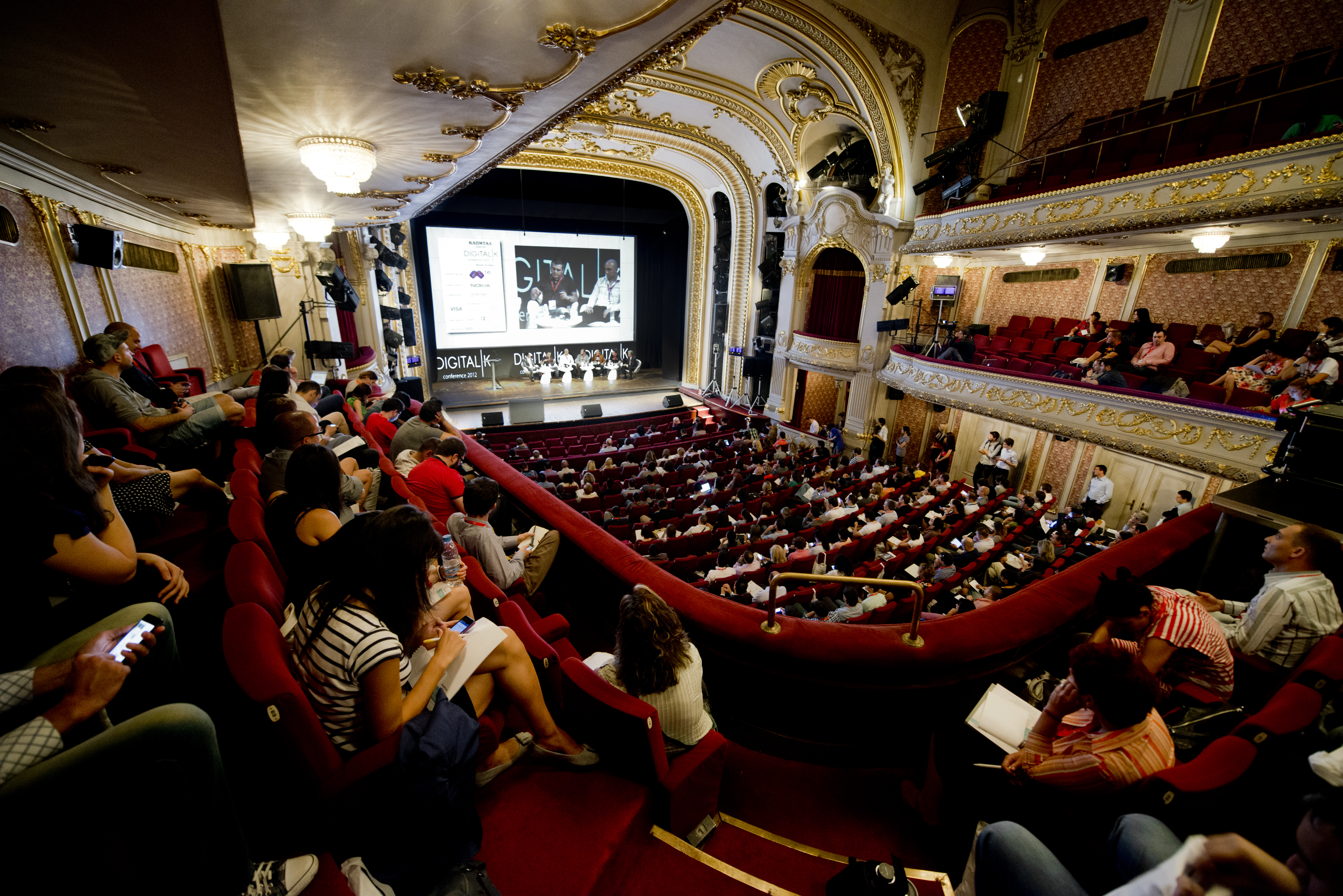
View from the Ivan Vazov National Theatre during Digitalk 2012.

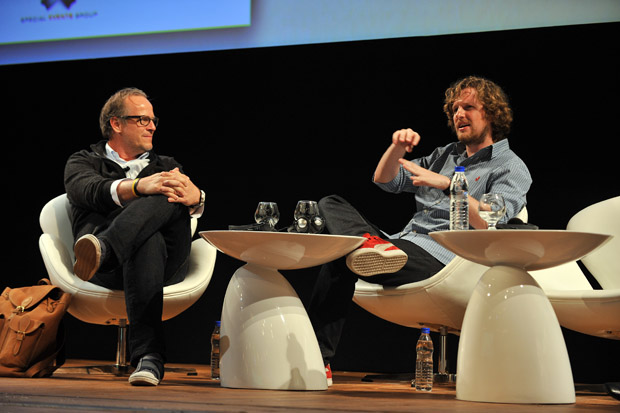
Matt Mullenweg and Tony Conrad, founder of About.me, at Digitalk 2011.

Digitalk (pronounced "digital kay") is an annual two-day technology conference organized by the Bulgarian business newspaper Capital weekly. Digitalk provides a place for discussion between creative professionals, investors, entrepreneurs, and marketing executives on the future of the web. Speakers cover topics such as mobile marketing, online advertising, commerce, brand storytelling, and entrepreneurship. The first conference was held at the Ivan Vazov National Theatre in Sofia, Bulgaria on September 26, 2011. Its topics addressed the influence of mobile technologies on business and society. Past speakers include Matt Mullenweg, Horace Dediu, Felix Salmon, James McKelvey, Sasha Bezuhanova, and other. The 2011 conference drew more than 700 people from all over Southeastern Europe.

In 2011 the promotional campaign for Digitalk, created by Next-DC, won two golden awards at FARA, the Bulgarian fair for advertising agencies.

The 2012 conference was held on October, 1. Its three central topics were the rise of entrepreneurship in Southeast Europe, mobile commerce, and digital brand storytelling. Speakers included Tom Eslinger, worldwide digital creative director at Saatchi & Saatchi, Ben Barokas from Google, Prof. Paul Kewene-Hite, former evangelist at Apple, Edu Pou, creative director at Wieden+Kennedy Amsterdam, Miriam Healy from AKQA Berin, Jon Bradford, managing director at Springboard, Dieter Kopitzki, head of digital marketing at Audi, Jay Basnight, head of digital strategy at Puma, etc.

Next edition of Digitalk is scheduled for June 3, 2013. It will be focused only on topics related to technology startups. The conference would be structured in three keynotes each covering the tree stages in the development of a startup - Early stage, Later stage, and Exit.
