= Neil Mendoza (artist) =

British new media artist

Neil Mendoza is a British new media artist known for his kinetic and installation artworks.

== Work ==
A number of Mendoza's artworks rely on a combination of computer technologies and actuators to produce artistic effects. These electromechanical systems often uses humor, absurdity and futility as strategies to engage viewers.

== Exhibitions ==
Mendoza's works have been shown at exhibitions such as at the Museo Nazionale Scienza e Tecnologia in Milan, Oi Futura in Brasil, the Victoria and Albert Museum, London and the Barbican, London. His piece "SPAMBOTS" consists of several tins of Spam typing with their four robot arms on individual keys to create a novel on porcine caste systems. It is displayed at the Misalignment Museum in San Francisco.
