= Dean Ball =

AI policy researcher

Dean W. Ball is an American artificial intelligence policy researcher. He graduated from Hamilton College with a BA in history.

In April 2025, Ball joined the Trump administration as the Senior Policy Advisor for Artificial Intelligence and Emerging Technology at the White House Office of Science and Technology Policy. He was the primary author of the administration's AI Action Plan. He left in August 2025 to join the Foundation for American Innovation as a senior fellow. In March 2026, he joined the Heritage Foundation as a visiting fellow.

In July 2026, Ball joined OpenAI as head of strategic futures.
