= AI Action Plan =

2025 United States federal artificial intelligence policy document

- Winning the Race: America's AI Action Plan
- President: Donald Trump
- Signed: July 23, 2025

Summary
- Sets out more than 90 federal policy actions across three pillars to maintain U.S. global leadership in artificial intelligence

"Winning the Race: America's AI Action Plan" is a policy blueprint published by the Trump administration describing policy actions related to AI. It was announced by Donald Trump at the "Winning the AI Race" event.

The plan differed from the Biden administration AI policy.

Trump signed three executive orders at the same time as announcing the plan.
