= Sasha Bezuhanova =

Bulgarian activist

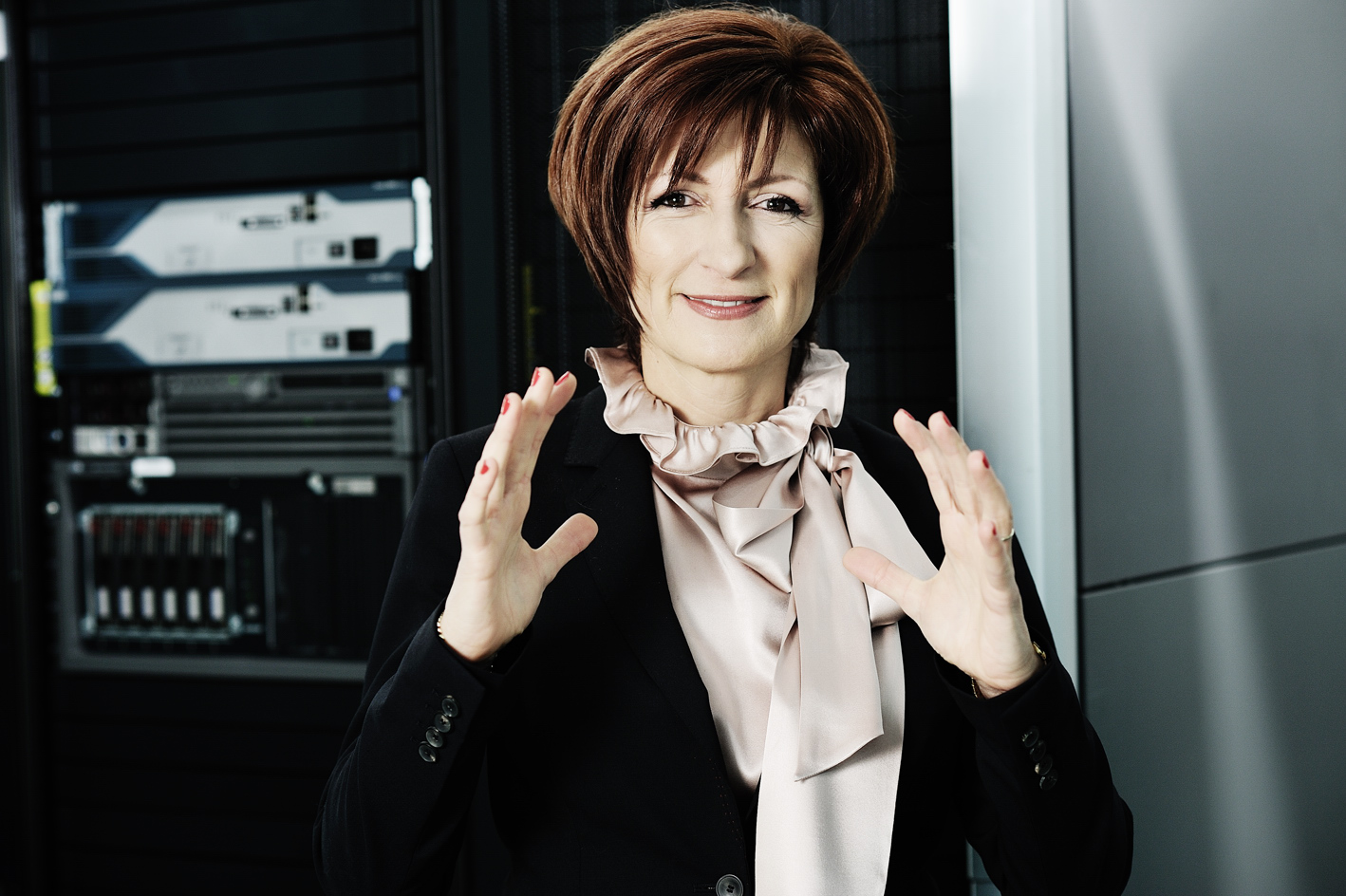
- Born: 27 September 1962 (age 63); Pernik, Bulgaria
- Education: Technical University, Sofia; Graduate Institute in Geneva
- Known for: Founder of MOVE.BG; Internationally recognized business executive and philanthropist with a multi-dimensional track record of service to society

Sasha Bezuhanova (Bulgarian: Саша Безуханова) is a Bulgarian entrepreneur and philanthropist.

During her business career, Bezuhanova had different roles. She was Director of Public Sector for the world Growth Markets at Hewlett-Packard. Previously she had managed the Central Eastern Europe Public sector business of the corporation. Before that Sasha was the General Manager of Hewlett-Packard Bulgaria for more than 10 years.

Bezuhanova is Chair of the Boards of WWF CEE and Bulgarian Center of Women in Technologies, co-founder and board member of the Digital Innovation Hub DigiTech 4.0 and Green Finance and Energy Center, a European Climate Pact Ambassador, and Advisor in GreenTech Alliance. She is a former member of Governing board of the European Institute for Innovation and Technology (EIT) and an EIC Jury member.

In 2013, she founded the yearly Entrepregirl Award. She is a mentor and investor in a number of technological and sustainability startups as also LP in three VC funds. Bezuhanova is a regular public speaker on Bulgarian, European, and world forums on the topics of innovation, entrepreneurship, sustainability, women's leadership, and societal transformation in the digital era.

Sasha Bezuhanova was named Digital woman of Europe for 2013 by the European Commission. She is an Honorary Consul of Luxembourg to Bulgaria.
