= Misalignment Museum =

AI art museum in San Francisco

- Established: 2023
- Location: San Francisco
- Type: Art and technology museum
- Manager: Audrey Kim
- Website: misalignmentmuseum.com

The Misalignment Museum displayed art pieces about artificial intelligence and its impacts, with some interactive exhibits. The exhibits in the spring of 2023 provided a window into some versions of a post-apocalyptic world where misaligned AI has destroyed most of humanity, but corrects itself before wiping everybody out and creates the museum to memorialize civilization.

Paperclip Embrace

During its initial eight-week popup run in early 2023 in the Mission District of San Francisco, the museum showcased somewhat more optimistic visions upstairs and more dystopian visions downstairs. Founder and curator Audrey Kim expressed hope that the museum would inspire those building the technologies to think more carefully about the implications of their work and also make those conversations about AI dangers more accessible to the average person. The museum then ran another popular pop-up at the Chase Center in Mission Bay starting in September of that year and ending in August 2024. The museum was set to reopen in February 2025 and evolve to focus less on visions of the future and more on education and sparking questions and conversations. As of August 2026, the museum was closed to the public but renting out art pieces for events.

== Exhibits ==
"Paperclip Embrace" is made up of 15,000 paperclips and references Nick Bostrom's paperclip maximizer problem, a 2003 thought experiment about what could go wrong if an artificial intelligence was instructed to make paperclips without enough safeguards.

SPAMBOTS by Neil Mendoza

"The Infinite Conversation" is a continuous conversation between AI-generated models of Werner Herzog and Slavo Žižek.

"SPAMBOTS" is a piece by Neil Mendoza where several tins of Spam are typing with their four robot arms on individual keys to create a novel about caste systems for pigs.

Other exhibits include AI-generated paintings by Grimes, a framed tweet by Dustin Moskovitz about effective altruism, and a piano playing music composed by bacteria.

== Reception ==
Art piece from Misalignment Museum

Mission Local said the museum was "at times funny, at times chilling".

SFGate said the museum was a warning from the future, where visitors were encouraged to think critically and creatively about the implications of AI.

The San Francisco Standard said the pop-up museum combined 'an apocalyptic premise' with 'beauty and whimsy'.

Eric Dimond, the senior director of exhibits at the Exploratorium, praised the use of art to explore the concept of AI.

On Tripadvisor, the museum received an average of 5.0 stars over its first 176 reviews between September 2023 and August 2024.

== See also ==
- AI art
- Internet Archive building
