= Artificial wisdom =

System displaying wisdom and morals

Artificial wisdom (AW) is an artificial intelligence (AI) system which is able to display the human traits of wisdom and morals while being able to contemplate its own “endpoint”. Artificial wisdom can be described as artificial intelligence reaching the top-level of decision-making when confronted with the most complex challenging situations. The term artificial wisdom is used when the "intelligence" is based on more than by chance collecting and interpreting data, but by design enriched with smart and conscience strategies that wise people would use.

== Overview ==
The goal of artificial wisdom is to create artificial intelligence that can successfully replicate the “uniquely human trait[s]” of having wisdom and morals as closely as possible. Thus, artificial wisdom, must “incorporate [the] ethical and moral considerations” of the data it uses. There are also many significant ethical and legal implications of AW which are compounded by the rapid advances in AI and related technologies alongside the lack of the development of ethics, guidelines, and regulations without the oversight of any kind of overarching advisory board. Additionally, there are challenges in how to develop, test, and implement AW in real world scenarios. Existing tests do not test the internal thought process by which a computer system reaches its conclusion, only the result of said process.

When examining computer-aided wisdom; the partnership of artificial intelligence and contemplative neuroscience, concerns regarding the future of artificial intelligence shift to a more optimistic viewpoint. This artificial wisdom forms the basis of Louis Molnar's monographic article on artificial philosophy, where he coined the term and proposes how artificial intelligence might view its place in the grand scheme of things.

== Definitions ==
There are no universal or standardized definitions for human intelligence, artificial intelligence, human wisdom, or artificial wisdom. However, the DIKW pyramid, describes the continuum of relationship between data, information, knowledge, and wisdom, puts wisdom at the highest level in its hierarchy. Gottfredson defines intelligence as “the ability to reason, plan, solve problems, think abstractly, comprehend complex ideas, learn quickly, and learn from experience”.

Definitions for wisdom typically include requiring:

- The ability for emotional regulation,
- Pro-social behaviors (e.g., empathy, compassion, and altruism),
- Self-reflection,
- “A balance between decisiveness and acceptance of uncertainty and diversity of perspectives, and social advising.”

As previously defined, Artificial Wisdom would then be an AI system which is able to solve problems via “an understanding of…context, ethics and moral principles,” rather than simple pre-defined inputs or “learned patterns.” Some scientists have also considered the field of artificial consciousness. However, Jeste states that “…it is generally agreed that only humans can have consciousness, autonomy, will, and theory of mind.” An artificially wise system must also be able to contemplate its end goal and recognize its own ignorance. Additionally, to contemplate its end goal, a wise system must have a “correct conception of worthwhile goals (broadly speaking) or well-being (narrowly speaking)”. "Stephen Grimm further suggests that the following three types of knowledge are individually necessary for wisdom: first, "knowledge of what is good or important for well-being", second, "knowledge of one’s standing, relative to what is good or important for well-being", and third, "knowledge of a strategy for obtaining what is good or important for wellbeing.""

== Problems ==
There are notable problems with attempting to create an artificially wise system. Consciousness, autonomy, and will are considered strictly human features.

=== Values ===
There are significant ethical and philosophical issues when attempting to create an intelligent or a wise system. Notably, whose moral values will be used to train the system to be wise. Differing moral values and prejudice can already be seen from various organizations and governments in artificial intelligence. Deployment strategies and values of Artificial Wisdom will conflict between leaders, companies, and countries. Nusbaum states, “When values are in conflict, leaders often make choices that are clever or smart about their own needs, but are often not wise.”

=== Ethics ===
Science fiction author Isaac Asimov realized the need to control the technology in the 1940s when he wrote the three laws of robotics as follows:

- A robot may not injure a human directly or indirectly.
- A robot must obey human’s orders.
- A robot should seek to protect its own existence.

Additionally, the pace at which technology is rapidly advancing artificial intelligence and thus the need for artificial wisdom may “have outpaced the development of societal guidelines have raised serious questions about the ethics and morality of AI, and called for international oversight and regulations to ensure safety.”

=== Principal impossibility ===
One argument, coined by Tsai as the “argument against AW,” or AAAW, postulates the principal impossibility of Artificial Wisdom. The argument is based on the philosophical differences between practical wisdom, also called phronesis, and practical intelligence. Said difference isn’t in “selecting the correct means, but reasoning correctly about what ends to follow”. Tsai puts the argument into a logical proposition as follows:

- “(P1) An agent is genuinely wise only if the agent can deliberate about the final goal of the domain in which the agent is situated.”
- “(P2) An intelligent agent cannot deliberate about the final goal of the domain in which the agent is situated.”
- “(C1) An intelligent agent cannot be genuinely wise.”
- “(P3) An AW is, at its core, intelligent.”
- “(C2) An AW cannot be genuinely wise.”
