= Daniel Kokotajlo =

Artificial intelligence researcher

- Born: Daniel Bendisi Kokotajlo
- Education: University of Notre Dame (BA); University of North Carolina, Chapel Hill (MA)
- Scientific career
- Fields: Artificial intelligence, AI governance, philosophy
- Workplaces: OpenAI; AI Futures Project

Daniel Bendisi Kokotajlo is an artificial intelligence (AI) researcher. He was a researcher in the governance division of OpenAI from 2022 to 2024. He leads the AI Futures Project and co-wrote the scenarios AI 2027 and AI 2040: Plan A.

== Biography ==
=== Education ===
Kokotajlo studied at the University of Notre Dame, where he graduated with a BA in philosophy in 2014. He went on to study philosophy in graduate school at the University of North Carolina at Chapel Hill, where he obtained an MA in 2017 under the supervision of John Thomas Roberts. During his doctoral studies in philosophy at UNC, he was a recipient of the 2019–2020 Maynard Adams Fellowship for the Public Humanities.

=== OpenAI ===
In 2022, he became a researcher in the governance division of OpenAI.

Kokotajlo was one of the organizers of a group of OpenAI employees that claimed the company had a secretive and reckless culture that was taking grave risks in the rush to achieve artificial general intelligence (AGI). When he resigned in 2024, he refused to sign OpenAI's non-disparagement clause, which could have cost him approximately $2 million in equity. As of May 2024, Kokotajlo confirmed he retained the vested equity. In June 2024, he and other current and former AI company employees signed a letter arguing that top frontier AI companies have strong financial incentives to avoid oversight, and calling for a "right to warn" about AI risks without fear of reprisal and while protecting anonymity.

In 2024, Time included him in its TIME100 AI list of the 100 most influential people in artificial intelligence.

=== AI forecasting ===
In 2021, Kokotajlo wrote a blog post named "What 2026 Looks Like". In 2025, Kevin Roose commented that "A number of his predictions proved prescient."

He cofounded and leads the AI Futures Project, a nonprofit based in Berkeley, California which researches the future impact of artificial intelligence. In April 2025, the organization released AI 2027, a detailed forecast scenario predicting rapid progress in the automation of software development and AI research, followed by AGI. It laid out a scenario in which fully autonomous AI agents would be better than humans at "everything" around the end of 2027, imagining its impacts on the economy, domestic politics and international relations. The scenario has two alternative endings, exploring continued competition and a slowdown in AI development. Ali Farhadi, chief executive of the Allen Institute for Artificial Intelligence, criticized the forecast as insufficiently grounded in scientific evidence.

In December 2025, Kokotajlo and his colleagues published updated forecasts placing full coding automation in the early 2030s.

AI 2040: Plan A, a follow-up to AI 2027 presenting a more optimistic scenario, was published in July 2026. The report recommends delaying the development of superintelligence until 2040.
