= Surveillance pricing =

Pricing strategy

Surveillance pricing is a form of dynamic pricing where a consumer's personal data and behavior is used to determine their willingness to pay. This form of price discrimination assesses price sensitivity for products or services based on an individual's characteristics and behaviors including location, demographics, browsing patterns, shopping history, and inferred emotional or financial states.

The practice has been described as "personalized pricing", which has been taken to reflect an economic view that it adds value for consumers. It has also been described as personalized price gouging (similar to scalping) and has raised concerns over algorithmic discrimination, consumer privacy, digital redlining, and undermining price discovery. Proponents suggest the practice could be implemented in a manner akin to a progressive tax enabling price equity.

== United States ==
In the United States, several states including California, New York, Georgia, Ohio, Maryland and Illinois have drafted bills to regulate the practice. A councilor in the city of Portland, Oregon has begun drafting a city ordinance.

== Canada ==
As of April 2026, the Manitoba NDP, under the leadership of Premier Wab Kinew, has opposed personalized algorithmic pricing at the provincial level with Bill 49. At the national level, NDP leader Avi Lewis has pressed majority Liberal Party leader Mark Carney to outlaw such "downright dystopian" practices.

== United Kingdom ==
The Digital Markets, Competition and Consumers Act 2024 allows the Competition and Markets Authority to fine companies up to 10% of global revenue for hidden or biased digital pricing.
