= Hungry judge effect =

Cognitive bias

The hungry judge effect is the observation that judges' verdicts are more lenient after a meal break. Since the original study, the term has morphed to encompass a stream of research concerned with implications of hunger on economic and social behavior. However, it has been suggested that this may be an artifact of case scheduling.

== Original study ==
A study of the decisions of Israeli parole boards was made in 2011. It found that the granting of parole was 65% at the start of a session but would drop to nearly zero before a meal break. The authors suggested that mental depletion as a result of fatigue caused decisions to increasingly favour the status quo, while rest and replenishment then restored a willingness to make bold decisions. The paper, which was published in the Proceedings of the National Academy of Sciences, has been cited many times – close to 2,500 times by 2026.

== Responses ==
A few months after the original paper, the Proceedings of the National Academy of Sciences published a letter arguing, based on conversations with attorneys, a judge, and other personnel, that case ordering is not random, as, e.g., within sessions, unrepresented prisoners usually go last and represented prisoners sharing an attorney may have their ordering determined strategically by counsel. On this basis, they argue that the "phenomenon of favorable decisions peaking after a meal break is likely an artifact of the order of case presentation". A later analysis and simulations suggested that at least part of the effect might arise from scheduling priorities – that cases with a lenient outcome required more time and so would not be scheduled in the time remaining before a break.

Psychologist Daniël Lakens has argued that the size of the effect in the original study is impossibly large.

More recent studies show that certain legal decisions can get more lenient with increasing case ordering, which might be caused by a direction-of-comparison mechanism rather than decision-makers' fatigue.

== Consequences ==
Interventions of AI and algorithms in the court such as COMPAS software are usually motivated by the hungry judge effect. However, some argue that the hungry judge effect is overstated in justifying the use of AI in law.

Robert Sapolsky uses this as an example to argue we have lesser free will than we think in his book Determined.

== Economic and social behavior during Ramadan ==
The hungry judge effect was thought to predict greater human kindness after the break of the Ramadan fast. However, the opposite has been observed in experimental studies. Observant participants showed greater kindness while fasting and less so after breaking their fast. Thus, the hungry judge effect is situation specific and impacted by morality triggers.
