= Algorithmic wage discrimination =

Utilization of algorithmic bias for discriminatory purposes

Algorithmic wage discrimination is the utilization of algorithmic bias to enable wage discrimination where workers are paid different wages for the same work. The term was coined by Veena Dubal, a law professor at the University of California College of the Law, San Francisco, in a 2023 publication.

== United States ==
In the United States, algorithmic wage discrimination may be illegal under United States antitrust laws.

== See also ==
- Algorithmic bias
- Wage discrimination
- Employment discrimination
- Pay equity
- Gender pay gap
- Equal pay for equal work
- Antitrust law
- Artificial intelligence
