= Loomis v. Wisconsin =

United States Supreme Court case

Loomis v. Wisconsin, 881 N.W.2d 749 (Wis. 2016), cert. denied, 137 S. Ct. 2290 (2017), was a Wisconsin Supreme Court case that was appealed to the United States Supreme Court.

The case challenged the state of Wisconsin's use of closed-source risk assessment software in the sentencing of Eric Loomis to six years in prison. The case alleged that using such software in sentencing violates the defendant's right to due process because it prevents the defendant from challenging the scientific validity and accuracy of such test. The case also alleged that the system in question (COMPAS) violates due process rights by taking gender and race into account. Hearing this case would have given the court "the opportunity to rule on whether it violates due process to sentence someone based on a risk-assessment instrument whose workings are protected as a trade secret."

The Supreme Court denied the writ of certiorari, thus declining to hear the case, on June 26, 2017.

== Background ==
In February 2013, Eric Loomis was found driving a car that had been used in a shooting. He was arrested, and pleaded guilty to eluding an officer. In determining his sentence, the judge looked at his criminal record as well as a score assigned by a tool called COMPAS.

The software works using a proprietary algorithm that considers some of the answers to a 137-item questionnaire. Developed by a private company called Equivant (formerly Northpointe), COMPAS has been used by the U.S. states of New York, Wisconsin, California, Florida's Broward County, and other jurisdictions.

COMPAS classified Loomis as high-risk of re-offending, and Loomis was sentenced to six years. He appealed the ruling on the grounds that the judge, in considering the outcome of an algorithm whose inner workings were secretive and could not be examined, violated due process.
