= Easystats =

Software package for the R language

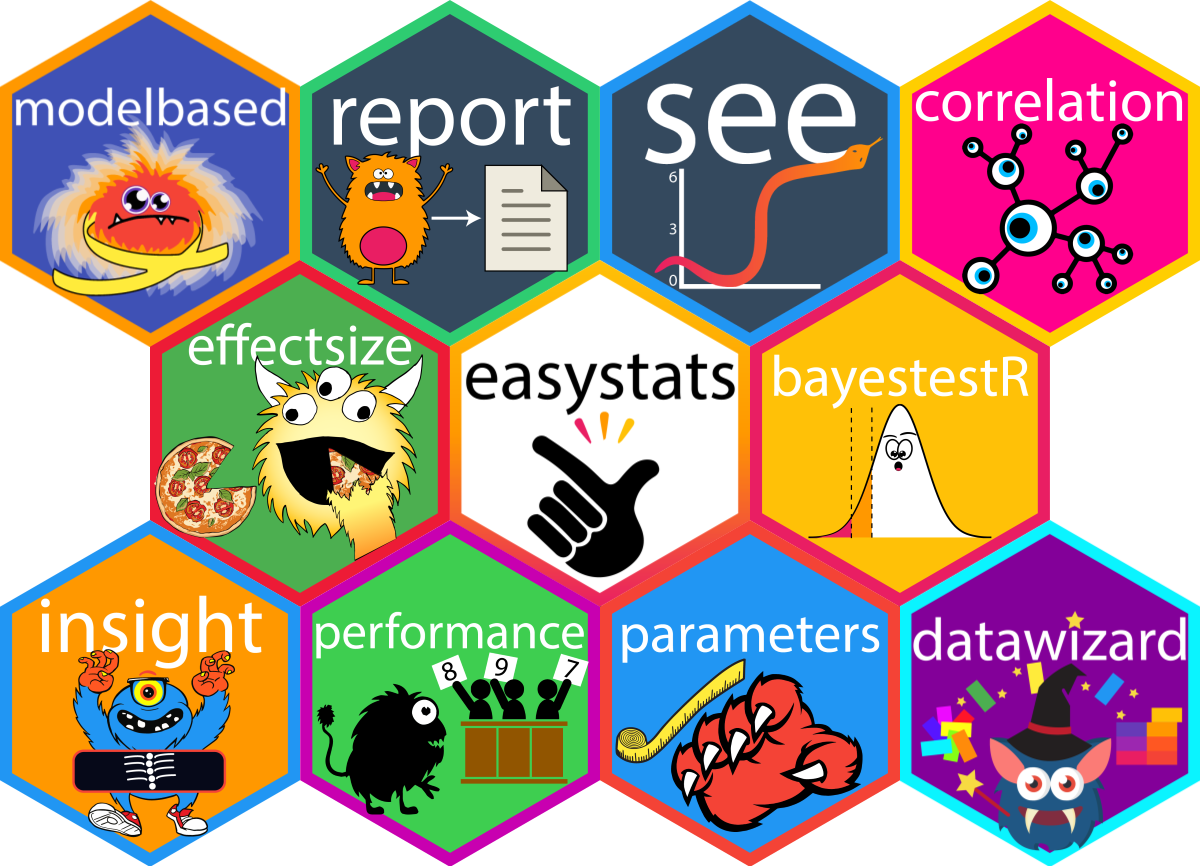
- Release: 2019
- Written in: R
- Operating system: All OS supported by R
- Available in: English
- Type: Statistical software
- License: GPL-3.0
- Website: github.com/easystats/easystats

The easystats collection of open source R packages was created in 2019 and primarily includes tools dedicated to the post-processing of statistical models. As of May 2022, the 10 packages composing the easystats ecosystem have been downloaded more than 8 million times, and have been used in more than 1000 scientific publications. The ecosystem is the topic of several statistical courses, video tutorials and books.

The aim of easystats is to provide a unifying and consistent framework to understand and report statistical results. It is also compatible with other collections of packages, such as the tidyverse. Notable design characteristics include its API, with a particular attention given to the names of functions and arguments (e.g., avoiding acronyms and abbreviations), and its low number of dependencies.

== History ==
In 2019, Dominique Makowski contacted software developer Daniel Lüdecke with the idea to collaborate around a collection of R packages aiming at facilitating data science for users without a statistical or computer science background. The first package of easystats, insight was created in 2019, and was envisioned as the foundation of the ecosystem. The second package that emerged, bayestestR, benefitted from the joining of Bayesian expert Mattan S. Ben-Shachar. Other maintainers include Indrajeet Patil, Brenton M. Wiernik, Etienne Bacher, and Rémi Thériault.

The easystats collection of packages as a whole received the 2023 Award from the Society for the Improvement of Psychological Science (SIPS).

== Packages ==
The easystats ecosystem contains ten semi-independent packages.

- insight: This package serves as the foundation of the ecosystem as it allows manipulating objects from different R packages.
- datawizard: This package implements some core data manipulation features.
- bayestestR: This package provides utilities to work with Bayesian statistics. The package received a Commendation award by the Society for the Improvement of Psychological Science (SIPS) in 2020.
- correlation: This package is dedicated to running correlation analyses.
- performance: This package allows the extraction of metrics of model performance.
- effectsize: This packages computes indices of effect size and standardized parameters.
- parameters: This package centres around the analysis of the parameters of a statistical model.
- modelbased: This package computes model-based predictions, group averages and contrasts.
- see: This package interfaces with ggplot2 to create visual plots.
- report: This package implements an automated reporting of statistical models.

== See also ==
- Tidyverse
- R (programming language)
