= Recital (law) =

In American law, a recital (from Latin: recitare, "to read out") consists of an account or repetition of the details of some act, proceeding or fact. Particularly, in law, that part of a legal document—such as a lease, which contains a statement of certain facts—contains the purpose for which the deed is made.

In European Union law, a recital is a text that sets out reasons for the provisions of an enactment, while avoiding normative language and political argumentation. A recital may also appear at the end of a document, as some 173 do in the General Data Protection Regulation. Recitals have been demonstrated to play a limited role in the interpretation of Union legislation in the courts in the case of ambiguity in a particular provision within the legislation.

In English, by convention, most recitals start with the word Whereas.

A recital can, and should, be taken into account when interpreting the meaning of a contractual agreement.

== See also ==
- Preamble
