= Daniel Lakens =

Dutch experimental psychologist

Daniël Lakens (born 1980) is a Dutch experimental psychologist known for his contributions to meta-science, research methods, and applied statistics. He is a faculty member in the Human-Technology Interaction group at Eindhoven University of Technology. In 2023 Lakens was awarded the Ammodo Science Award for fundamental research in the Social Sciences, acknowledging his efforts to enhance research reliability and efficiency. Lakens is known for his work on improving research practices through education. He is best known for developing the online course "Improving Your Statistical Inferences", which has enrolled over 61,000 students.
