= Grok sexual deepfake scandal =

AI chatbot image controversy

Since 2025, SpaceXAI's chatbot, Grok, has allowed users to alter images of individuals, including minors, to show them in bikinis or transparent clothing, or in sexually suggestive contexts, without the consent of the person being portrayed. The majority of these prompts were targeted at women and girls. Users were able to generate such images by providing a photo and a request to Grok, such as "put her in a bikini", to which the chatbot would publicly reply with a generated image.

The scandal drew significant criticism from lawmakers across the world, and there were calls for bans on X, as well as legal crackdowns on X and xAI for, amongst other reasons, the facilitation of sexual abuse, revenge porn and child pornography.

== Background ==
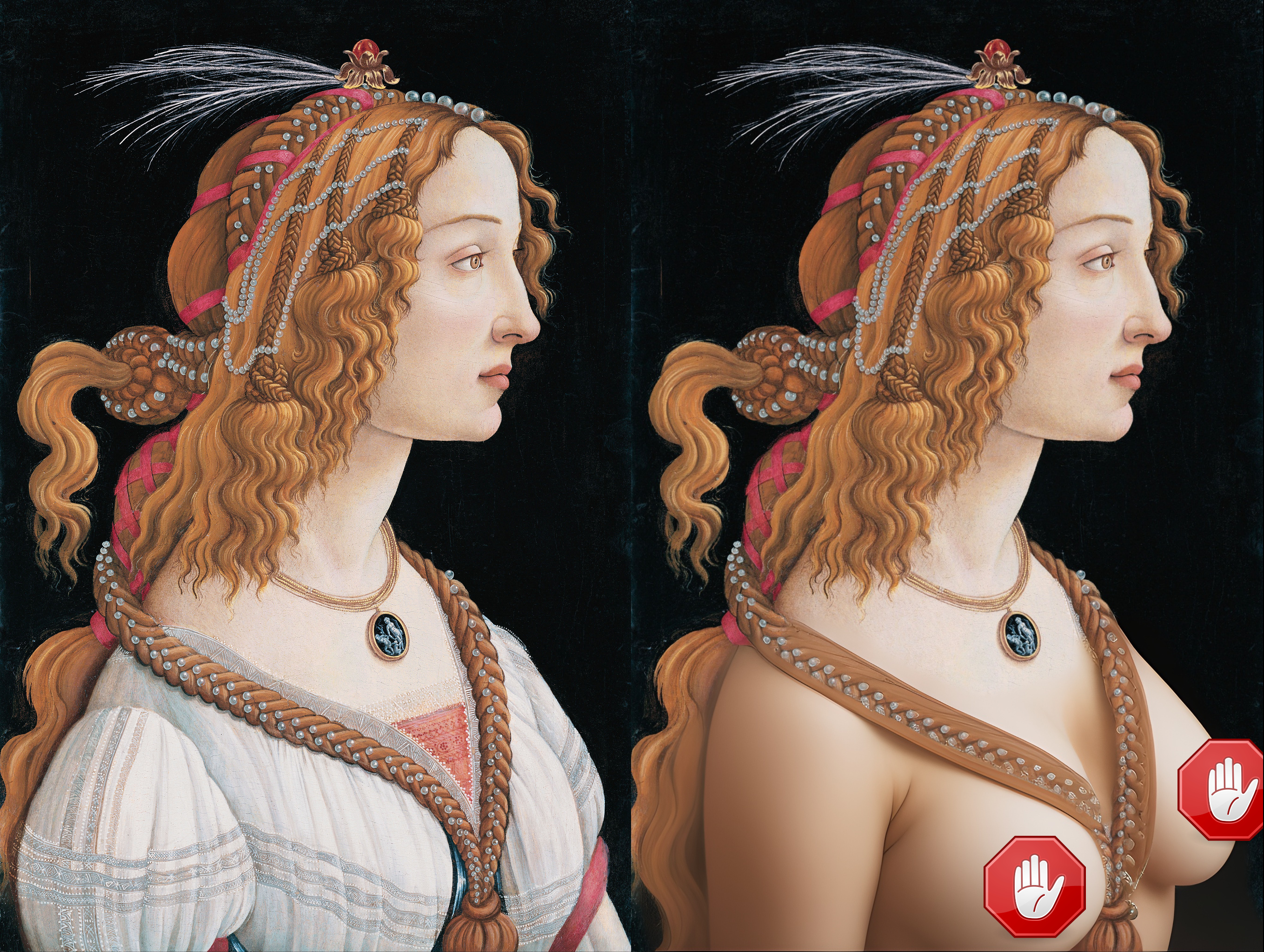
Portrait of a Young Woman by Sandro Botticelli (1480) on the left, "nudified" through deepfake technology on the right, with censorship added afterward

Deepfake pornography emerged in the late 2010s with the advent of machine learning. Originally, it was created on a small individual scale using a combination of machine learning algorithms, computer vision techniques, and AI software. However, the production process has significantly evolved since 2018, with the advent of several public apps that have largely automated the process. Since 2023, several AI apps available on Google Play and the Apple App Store are capable of "nudify-ing" user provided photos to generate non-consensual deepfake pornography.

Grok would first be proposed by Elon Musk in 2023, when he expressed an intention to create his own AI chatbot to "combat bias". Grok version 2.0, released on August 14, 2024, would introduce image generation capabilities, ones which would be improved over successive updates.

== Grok deepfake generation ==
Cases of Grok being used to remove the clothes from women in pictures, replacing them with bikinis or lingerie, began to surface in May 2025. By late December 2025, a trend of X users requesting such edits to women's photos without permission had taken root, and this received significant media attention in the first few days of January 2026. Some users prompted Grok to edit photos of women into sexualized poses, and others to add blood and bruising, with the chatbot publicly posting these graphic images in response.

Grok's X account was restricted on January 9 from posting image generation responses to users who are not paid subscribers, providing a link to "subscribe to unlock these features". All users were still able to generate Grok-altered images using X's "Edit image" feature, and the standalone Grok website and app. By March 19, Grok's Imagine feature was fully restricted to paid subscribers only (SuperGrok tier) for both the standalone Grok website and mobile app. As of June 2026, Grok is still being used to generate and host sexual deepfakes.

== Analysis ==
An analysis of 20,000 images generated by Grok between December 25, 2025, and January 1, 2026, showed 2% appeared to be 18 or younger, including 30 of "young or very young" women or girls in bikinis or transparent clothes. A Reuters review of Grok requests over 10 minutes on January 2 found 102 attempts to put women in bikinis. A separate analysis conducted over 24 hours from January 5 to 6 calculated that users had Grok create 6,700 sexually suggestive or nudified images per hour—84 times more so than the top 5 deepfake websites combined.

Wired reported that far more graphic AI-generated sexual imagery was being created by Grok on its website and app, which are separate to X, including female celebrities removing their clothes and engaging in sexual acts. An analysis of 800 pieces of recovered content by the Paris-based nonprofit AI Forensics found that almost 10% were "instances of photorealistic people, very young, doing sexual activities".

AI-generated sexually explicit or exploitative image claims are now being treated more like product safety or personal injury harms, not just privacy violations. Because harm may occur the moment an image is generated, some plaintiffs argue liability should focus on the system's design and safety safeguards.

== Reactions ==
On January 15, the Get Grok Gone campaign delivered letters to Apple and Google, demanding the removal of the app from Apple Store and Google Play Store, respectively. The campaign accused both companies of profiting from nonconsensual intimate imagery and child sexual abuse imagery, which were also banned by the companies own policies. The Get Grok Gone campaign argues that the restrictions placed on Grok by xAI are not enough and that Apple and Google are enabling the distribution of harmful material by hosting the apps.

=== Elon Musk and xAI ===
xAI responded to requests for comment from media organizations with the automated reply, "Legacy Media Lies".

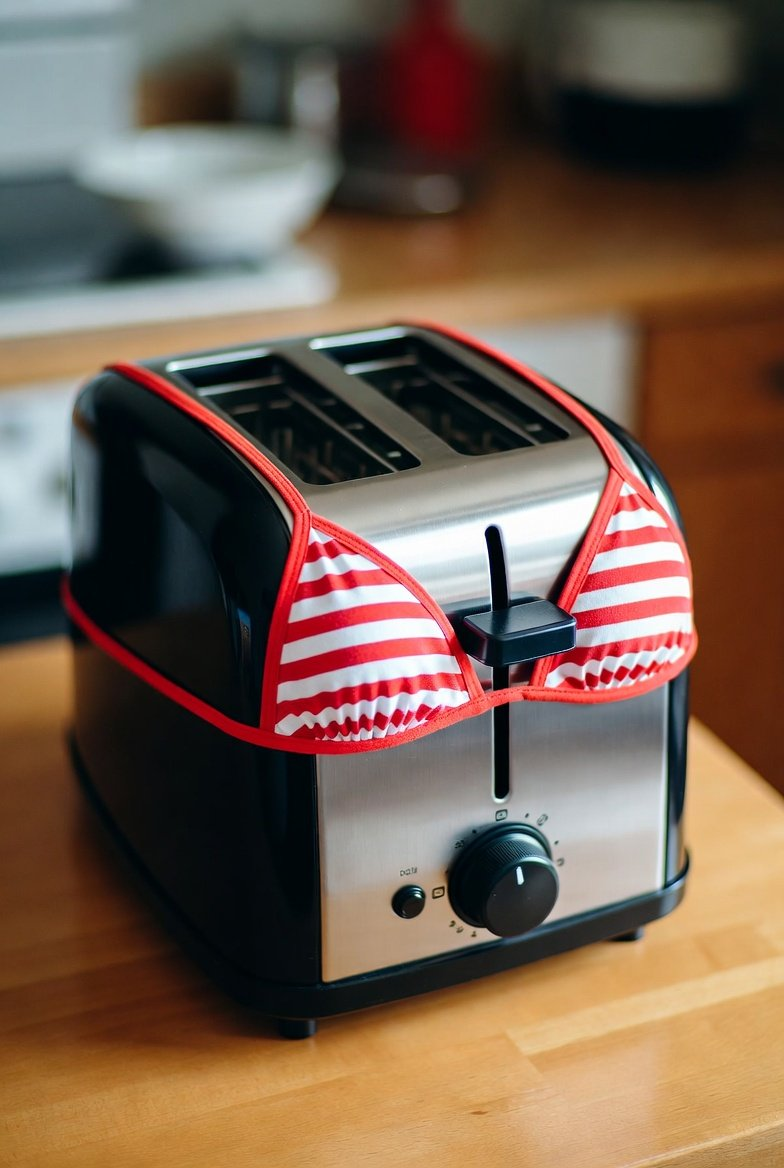
Grok-generated image of a toaster with a bikini on it, to which Elon Musk "couldn't stop laughing". Grok allows its users to do the same with images of living women and girls.

On January 2, Elon Musk reacted "Not sure why, but I couldn't stop laughing about this one 🤣🤣" to an image of a toaster dressed in a bikini by Grok. Later, on January 14, Elon Musk said that he was "not aware of any naked underage images generated by Grok. Literally zero." Later that same day, xAI announced that X users will no longer be able to use Grok to alter images of real people to portray them in revealing clothing. However, verified X users, as well as users of the standalone Grok app and website, were still able to generate such images.

==== Elon Musk's family ====
Ashley St. Clair, mother of one of Elon Musk's children, reported that Grok users were creating fake sexualized images from her photos, including a photo of her as a child. She considers the photos to be a form of revenge porn, and considered suing under the Take It Down Act. A spokesperson for X stated, "We take action against illegal content on X, including child sexual abuse material (CSAM), by removing it, permanently suspending accounts, and working with local governments and law enforcement as necessary. Anyone using or prompting Grok to make illegal content will suffer the same consequences as if they upload illegal content." However, Grok continued to post non-consensual sexual images. On January 15, St. Clair filed a lawsuit against xAI in the New York Supreme Court.

=== Canada ===
In response to the Grok deepfake scandal, individuals have asked that the government of Canada boycott X. On January 10, 2026, Canadian MP and Minister of AI Evan Solomon declared that Canada "is not considering a ban on X".

In April 2026, Bill C-16, An Act to amend certain Acts in relation to criminal and correctional matters (child protection, gender-based violence, delays and other measures), was amended following a proposal by Conservative MP Andrew Lawton to ensure that AI-generated images and "nearly nude" intimate images are criminalized. A further proposal by NDP MP Leah Gazan to encompass "sexualized or humiliating contexts, such transparent bathing suits or being covered in blood or bruises" was voted down.

In June 2026, the Privacy Commissioner of Canada released a statement, finding that Grok had violated Canadian privacy law through its image generation capabilities.

=== France ===
On January 2, 2026, French ministers reported the AI tool to prosecutors, calling the content "manifestly illegal", and also asked regulators to check compliance with the Digital Services Act.

On February 3, Paris prosecutors office, a cybercrime team employed by them and Europol searched the Paris offices of X. The investigation started as one into allegations of abuse of algorithms and fraudulent data extraction, but has expanded into spreading Holocaust denial and sexual deepfakes. Elon Musk and former CEO Linda Yaccarino were summoned to a hearing on April 20, with other X staff as witnesses.

On April 20, Musk did not turn up for the hearing. The Paris prosecutors office told the BBC on April 20 that it had "taken note of the absence of the people summoned", adding "the presence or absence (of the people summoned) is not an obstacle to continuing the investigation".

=== India ===
Indian Member of Parliament Priyanka Chaturvedi filed a complaint to India's IT ministry, demanding a review of Grok's safety mechanisms.

=== Indonesia ===
On January 10, Indonesia announced that Grok will be temporarily blocked, becoming the first country to do so. Meutya Hafid, the Minister of Communication and Digital Affairs, stated that "the government views the practice of non-consensual sexual deepfakes as a serious violation of human rights, dignity, and the security of citizens in the digital space". Access to Grok in the country was later restored on February 1.

=== Ireland ===
On January 6, Coimisiún na Meán, the Irish media commission, said they were consulting with the European Commission about concerns that Grok was generating sexualized images of women and children. The same day, Ofcom of the United Kingdom contacted X concerning complaints about these images.

On January 13, Micheál Martin, Taoiseach of Ireland, announced he would talk with Rossa Fanning, the country's Attorney General, about the Grok chatbot being used to produce sexually explicit images of women and minors.

On January 14, the Garda Síochána announced there are 200 investigations into child sex abuse images generated by Grok. The Garda National Cyber Crime Bureau has also confirmed there is an ongoing investigation into Grok. Prosecutions could happen under the Harassment, Harmful Communications and Related Offences Act 2020, the Non-Fatal Offences Against the Person Act 1997 and the Child Trafficking and Pornography Act 1998. By March 3, the number of investigations had grown to 244.

On February 3, Labour Party TD Alan Kelly described as "disgraceful" the refusal of X to attend a media committee on the regulation of online platforms, despite the committee writing to them. He also described the controversy about Grok as "shameful" and "shocking". Regarding the committee meeting, scheduled for February 4, Kelly said "Meta have agreed to come in. Google have agreed to come in. TikTok have agreed to come in."

In February 2026 the Data Protection Commissioner opened an investigation into the Grok deepfake scandal under section 110 of the Data Protection Act 2018 as well as determining whether X violated the General Data Protection Regulation, including articles 5, 6, 25 and 35.

By March 3, the number of Garda investigations had risen to 244 with around half of those related to child sexual abuse material.

=== Japan ===
On January 16, Japanese minister Kimi Onoda revealed that the Cabinet Office had summoned representatives from the Japanese subsidiary of X Corp. on January 9 to formally request improvements regarding the generation of non-consensual sexual imagery. During that meeting, the government handed over a written inquiry and suggested that it might issue "administrative guidance" (non-binding advice) under the AI Promotion Act if no improvements were observed. However, the Japanese AI Promotion Act contains no explicit penalties for non-compliance or the misuse of AI, focusing instead on voluntary cooperation. The Minister disclosed these details while noting that X Corp. had not yet provided any response for over a week following the initial request.

=== Malaysia ===
On January 11, the Malaysian Communications and Multimedia Commission announced that Malaysia has suspended access to Grok. Later on January 23, access to Grok was restored after X announced that the platform implemented additional safety measures on Grok.

=== Philippines ===
On January 15, it was reported that Grok would be blocked in the Philippines with Henry Aguda, secretary of the Department of Information and Communications Technology (DICT), advocating the "need to clean the internet now". The next day, the DICT blocked the chatbot due to its violation of the Anti-Child Pornography Act of 2009 and the Cybercrime Prevention Act of 2012. On January 21, the DICT, in coordination with the National Privacy Commission and Cybercrime Investigation and Coordinating Center, lifted the ban on Grok after xAI committed to the removal of specific tools to address child safety concerns.

=== United Kingdom ===
On January 9, 2026, British prime minister Keir Starmer mentioned the possibility of banning X in the United Kingdom. "This is disgraceful, it's disgusting and it's not to be tolerated. X has got to get a grip of this, It's unlawful. We're not going to tolerate it. I've asked for all options to be on the table." Ofcom sent a request to X on January 5 and received a response. In response to Starmer's remarks U.S. representative Anna Paulina Luna called for sanctions against the United Kingdom if it went through with a ban. X owner Elon Musk responded on January 10 that the Starmer's government "want any excuse for censorship" and described it as "fascist".

On January 12, Ofcom announced that they would open an investigation into complaints about sexualized images generated by Grok. The same day, the UK announced it would enable that week the law criminalizing using AI to generate non-consensual intimate images and plans to ban nudify apps.

On June 3, 2026, the Labour MP Jess Asato sued Elon Musk's SpaceXAI for misuse of private information, asserting that the Grok AI platform had been used to create fake sexualised images of her.

In October 2026 it was announced that the Information Commission's Office (ICO), the UK's data protection watchdog, had opened an investigation into X and xAI on whether the social media platform and its parent had broken General Data Protection Regulations.

=== United States ===
Legal cases against xAI have been brought before courts in California where the company is headquartered. On January 14, 2026, California attorney general Rob Bonta announced an investigation into whether xAI has violated state law with Grok, stating "The avalanche of reports detailing the non-consensual, sexually explicit material that xAI has produced and posted online in recent weeks is shocking". On March 16, three teenagers from Tennessee sued xAI for creating child sexual abuse images based on images of them that were altered by a Grok user without their knowledge. They are seeking unspecified damages and an immediate order banning Grok from producing such images. On March 25, the city of Baltimore sued xAI, saying the company violated consumer protections.

In addition, Democratic senators Ron Wyden, Ben Ray Luján and Ed Markey wrote to the CEOs of Google and Apple to remove the Grok and X apps from their respective stores for violating the terms of service regarding illegal content and sexual exploitation of children. On January 23, 35 state attorneys general called on xAI to cease allowing sexual deepfakes to be generated.

== See also ==
- Artificial intelligence controversies
- Generative AI pornography
- Taylor Swift deepfake pornography controversy
