= ClothOff =

Artificial intelligence company

ClothOff is a website that enables users to create deepfake pornography of women and girls by uploading non-pornographic photos and applying the website's generative artificial intelligence tools. The website charges a fee for creation of these images. It is operated by AI/Robotics Venture Strategy 3 Ltd, a company incorporated in the British Virgin Islands with employees in Russia, Belarus, and Ukraine. ClothOff has been involved in controversies and lawsuits related to its users' generated images, especially because the website has enabled creation of non-consensual intimate imagery of minors, despite the company saying that is prohibited.

== Website and company ==
The ClothOff website enables users to upload photos of women and girls, wearing clothes or swimsuits, and use its generative AI software to create fake nude photography. It charges customers money for credits that enable generating explicit deepfakes. A researcher for the journalism group Bellingcat reported that ClothOff redirected payments through fake websites in order to use payment services like PayPal; PayPal has banned associated redirect sites several times.

The company that makes ClothOff is AI/Robotics Venture Strategy 3 Ltd, incorporated in the British Virgin Islands. According to reports from Der Spiegel and The Guardian, the company's employees are based in Russia, Belarus, and Ukraine. As of July 2025, the company owned at least ten other similar services for creating deepfake pornography, also called "nudify" apps. According to a report in Der Spiegel at that time, ClothOff was a leading app in this category. The company had "monthly views ranging between hundreds of thousands to several million" and an annual budget of about €3,000,000, with plans to expand marketing in Germany, Britain, France, Spain, and other countries. The adult content creator Sweetie Fox has advertised ClothOff.

As of 2024 and 2025, the company's website said that it was "impossible" to process images of minors using ClothOff. A lawsuit against ClothOff said that the company also provides an API that other websites and applications can integrate to use its deepfake technology, and that bots on Telegram promoted images made with ClothOff to hundreds of thousands of people.

ClothOff requires users to agree to a "clickwrap" terms of service that says the user will not use another person's images without consent, along with other terms that make an effort to shift legal liability to the user instead of the company.

== Legal issues and criminal investigations ==
In a town in southern Spain in 2023, police investigated reports of deepfake pornography made using ClothOff that depicted at least 20 girls in the town between 11 and 17 years old. The perpetrators in that case were 15 local boys, who received suspended sentences for distribution of child sexual abuse material.

In New Jersey in 2023, students at Westfield High School used ClothOff to generate explicit deepfakes of classmates who were underage girls, based on ordinary photos downloaded from social media. This incident contributed to concern among lawmakers. A United States federal law, TAKE IT DOWN Act, was enacted in May 2025 to criminalize publication of non-consensual intimate imagery (also called "revenge porn"). Several states also created laws against AI-generated non-consensual intimate imagery. A girl from the New Jersey high school worked with a Yale Law School professor to sue ClothOff in October 2025, alleging that another student used ClothOff to generate fake images that depicted her. The lawsuit aimed to shut down ClothOff. At the time of the lawsuit, some elements of the TAKE IT DOWN Act had not yet gone into effect, including changes to platform liability.

The City Attorney of San Francisco, David Chiu, sued ClothOff and 15 other deepfake pornography websites in August 2024.

The national data protection authority of Italy stated in October 2025 that ClothOff was banned from processing the personal information of Italian users, for reasons including protecting the personal data of minors.

== See also ==
- Artificial intelligence controversies
- Ethics of artificial intelligence
- Generative AI pornography
- National Center for Missing & Exploited Children
- Regulation of artificial intelligence
