= No-AI label =

Sign for products made without AI

A sign indicating an absence or ban of AI

A no-AI label is a label used on a product to signify that it was not made using generative artificial intelligence (AI). Phrases on the labels include but are not limited to "human-made", "proudly human" and "AI-free". Some organisations that provide the labels allow product creators to download and use their no-AI labels for free, while others charge creators for analysing the content and allowing the use of the labels if the organisation believes that no AI was used.

== Background ==
In 2025, Merriam-Webster chose "slop" as their word of the year, a term to describe low-quality content created by generative AI. By then AI-generated content had become harder for humans to detect when compared to previous years, as several signs of AI such as malformed hands and unnatural lighting had become much less prominent. Allison Morrow of CNN wrote that watching TikTok videos felt like taking an AI-or-not test. Some companies such as H&M have faced backlash for using AI in their advertising. In 2026, Cambridge Dictionary chose "human" as their word of the year. The chief editor, Colin McIntosh, said that "The growth of AI means it is now necessary to explicitly say 'human' for things that once could only be done by humans".

== Overview ==
A generic example of a "no AI" label

Some companies use labels to clarify that their products were made by humans, which has been compared to "organic produce" labels that may be placed on food, or fair trade labels. The human-made labels are the opposite of "Made by AI" labels. Phrases used in no-AI labels include but are not limited to "human-made", "proudly human" and "AI-free". Organisations want a unified standard so consumers have an understanding of what "AI free" means. Some organisations allow product creators to download and use no-AI labels for free, while others charge the creators to analyse the content and to allow the use of the labels if the organisation believes that no AI was used.

== Examples ==
A generic example of a "no AI" sign that does not mention AI, but instead affirms that the content was created by humans.

iHeartMedia has found that 90% of their viewers want the media they consume to be created by humans. In 2025, the company started requiring that their radio station DJs tell listeners that their content is "Guaranteed Human" during their hourly announcements of the station's call sign (the Federal Communications Commission requires these call sign announcements).

Authors Guild has a "Human Authored" certification. Books that are certified can use a logo that signifies that they were not made with AI. A UK startup named Books By People has an "Organic Literature" certification and allows publishers to use stamps to signify that their books are AI-free. Books by People allows minor uses of AI such as idea creation and formatting.

The 2024 film Heretic has the message "No generative AI was used in the making of this film". The closing credits of the American TV series Pluribus, first released in 2025, contains the phrase "This show was made by humans". In 2026 The Mise En Scene Company released a "No AI Used" label on the marketing materials of its film Forelock at Berlinale followed by an independent disclosure standard at Cannes.

In 2026, the music streaming platform Spotify launched "Verified by Spotify" badges, which are placed on profiles that follow "defined standards demonstrating authenticity". Profiles that release songs that Spotify deems to be AI-generated are not given the badge.

== See also ==
- Artificial intelligence controversies
- Opposition to AI data centers
