= TAKE IT DOWN Act =

2025 United States law

Tools to Address Known Exploitation by Immobilizing Technological Deepfakes on Websites and Networks
- Long title: An Act to require covered platforms to remove nonconsensual intimate visual deceptions, and for other purposes.
- Acronyms (colloquial): TAKE IT DOWN
- Enacted by: the 119th United States Congress
- Effective: May 19, 2025

Citations
- Public law: Pub. L. 119–12 (text) (PDF)
- Statutes at Large: 139 Stat. 55

Legislative history
- Introduced in the Senate as S. 146 by Ted Cruz (R–TX) on January 16, 2025; Committee consideration by Senate Committee on Commerce, Science, and Transportation; Passed the Senate on February 13, 2025 (by unanimous consent); Passed the House on April 28, 2025 (409–2); Signed into law by President Donald Trump on May 19, 2025

The Tools to Address Known Exploitation by Immobilizing Technological Deepfakes on Websites and Networks Act, or TAKE IT DOWN Act, is a United States law that aims to deal with non-consensual intimate imagery (sometimes called "revenge porn") posted to online sites and social media applications. The law addresses real photos and deepfakes, especially deepfake pornography, created with generative artificial intelligence tools. The bill was introduced by Senator Ted Cruz in June 2024, passed both houses by near unanimous votes by April 2025, and was signed into law by President Donald Trump on May 19, 2025.

== Background ==
Senator Ted Cruz first proposed the TAKE IT DOWN Act in June 2024 after a 2023 incident where several Aledo, Texas, high school students were subjected to sexual harassment when another student had taken seemingly innocent photos of them, but then posted photo-manipulated pictures of the students on Snapchat via an anonymous account, using existing software to make them appear nude. While Texas had laws to deal with deepfake videos, there was no regulation to punish the use of manipulated photos. The action took place outside of school grounds, leaving the school district unable to take action, and the parents could not get the local sheriff's office to take action. Three of the students transferred to a different school district due to the incident. After several months, Cruz contacted Snapchat directly, and the photos were removed within an hour. Cruz said "It should not take a sitting senator getting on the phone to take these down. If [the students] were Taylor Swift, they would be pulled down and should be. But they also should be pulled down for every teenager in Texas. You should have the same right. And that demonstrates that Snapchat knows exactly how to pull it down."

== Legislation ==
As introduced, the bill targeted non-consensual intimate imagery (NCII, sometimes known as "revenge porn"), both real and those created through artificial intelligence or other similar tools. It would criminalize the publication of NCII with up to two years of imprisonment with harsher penalties for images involving minors, require websites and social media services to remove such images at the request from the victim within 48 hours and delete any possible copies of them, while protecting good faith efforts to protect victims of NCII. Enforcement of the bill would be handled by the Federal Trade Commission (FTC). Criminal enforcement of the law would commence once passed, while services would have a year from passage to introduce reporting systems to handle takedown requests.

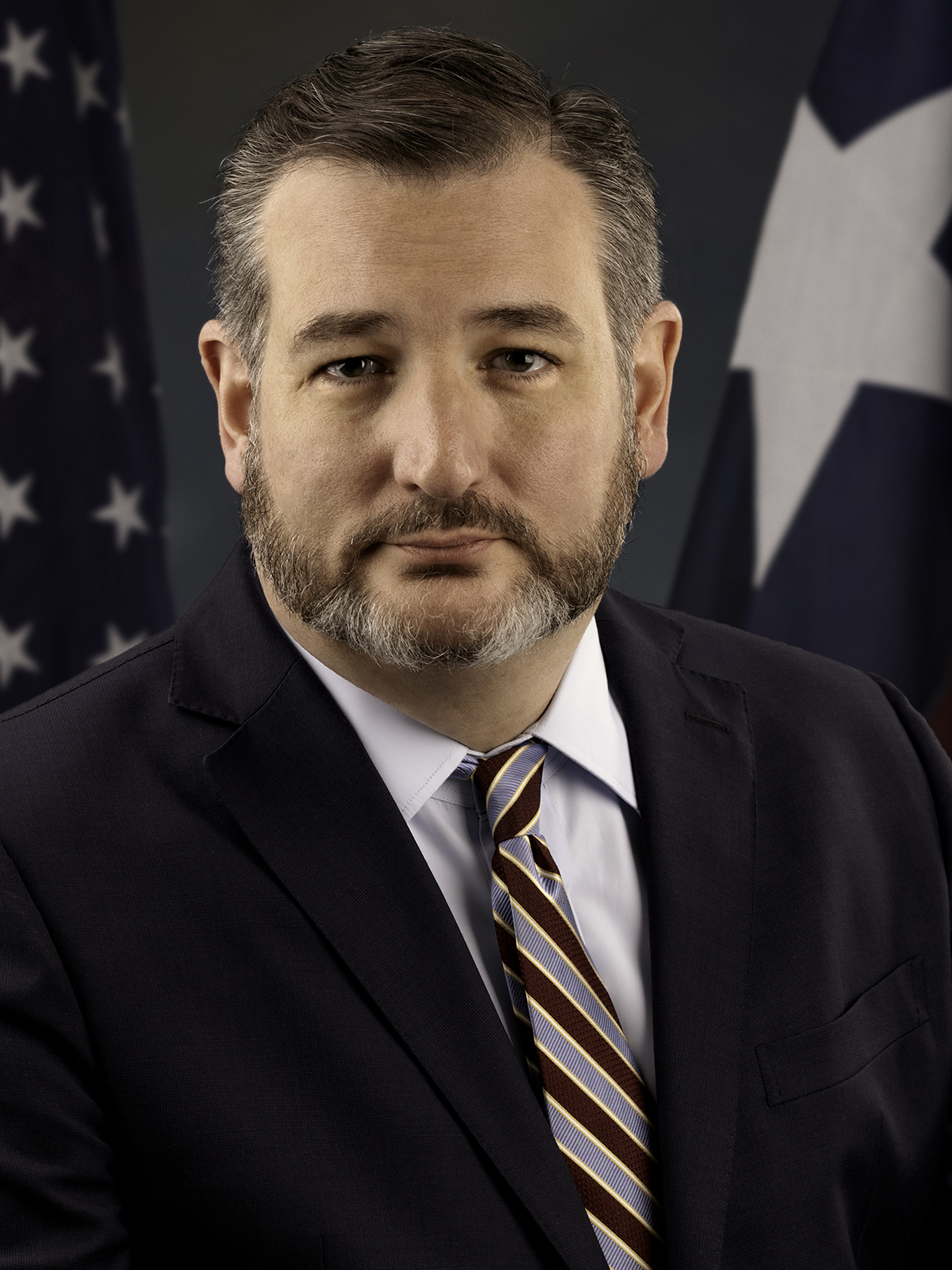
Senator Ted Cruz

Cruz, a Republican, worked with Democratic senator Amy Klobuchar to create a bi-partisan bill. It was co-sponsored by eleven other senators from both parties, and had support of several groups including the National Center for Missing & Exploited Children, SAG-AFTRA, the National Organization for Women and IBM.

Though the bill was first introduced for passage by unanimous consent in September 2024, its passage was blocked by Cory Booker; a spokesperson for Booker stated that Booker had objected to the bill in its current state and had been seeking to work with Cruz to modify it. During the following two months, Booker worked with Cruz to add amendments to the bill to specify which types of websites were subject to takedown requests and requiring users of these sites to be aware of this regulation once it came into force, and subsequently became a co-sponsor of the bill. The bill passed the Senate unanimously in December 2024. Cruz urged for the House of Representatives to vote on the bill before the end of the session. The House had incorporated the bill into part of a larger government funding package to avoid a government shutdown, which overall failed due to larger partisan issues; to pass the required extension, several amendments to the budget package, including the TAKE IT DOWN Act, were stripped from the bill. The bill did not get reintroduced before the end of the 118th United States Congress term.

Upon the start of the 119th Congress, Cruz re-introduced the bill, now with 20 co-sponsors, and it passed unanimously in February 2025. In the House, the bill was introduced by Representative María Elvira Salazar and passed the House's Committee on Energy and Commerce in early April 2025. It passed the full House on a 409–2 vote on April 28, 2025.

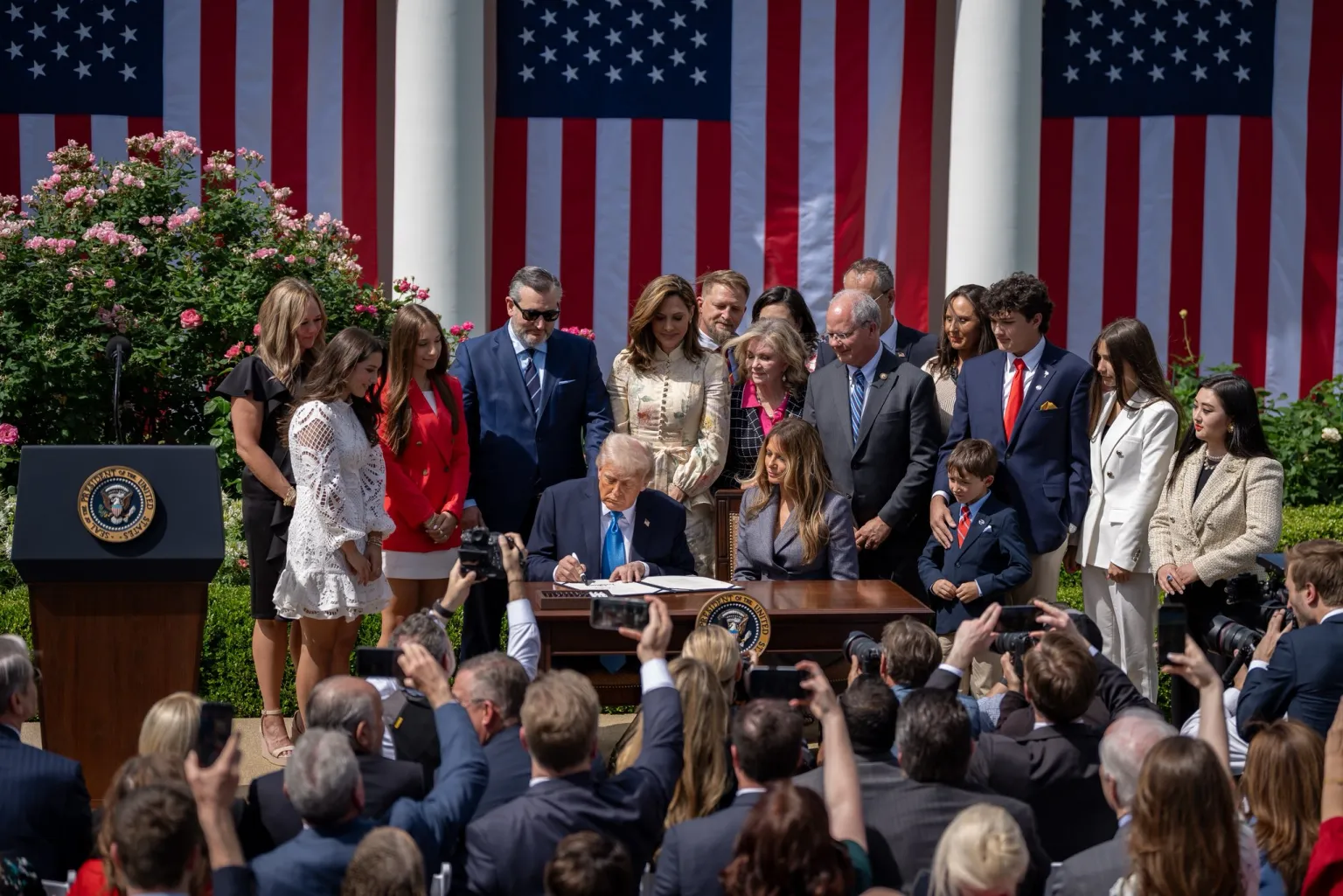
President Trump signing the bill into law at the White House on May 19, 2025

President Donald Trump had expressed support for the bill following his election to his second term. First Lady Melania Trump also built support for the bill, as it followed on her "Be Best" anti-cyberbullying advocacy that she had led during Trump's first term. Trump signed the bill into law on May 19, 2025, and invited Melania to also sign it.

The first conviction under the TAKE IT DOWN Act was issued in April 2026, on an Ohio man that had used AI to create NCII of local adults and children in his neighborhood, sharing these on a website promoting child sexual abuse; he was sentenced to 15 years in prison by September 2026. Melania Trump said she was proud to have helped get the law passed and supported the conviction. Enforcement of the bill against online services came into effect a year after passage on May 19, 2026.

== Criticism ==
The TAKE IT DOWN Act has drawn concerns from First Amendment-related groups such as the Center for Democracy & Technology, the Authors Guild, Demand Progress Action, the Electronic Frontier Foundation (EFF), Fight for the Future, the Freedom of the Press Foundation, New America's Open Technology Institute, Public Knowledge, and TechFreedom. These groups did not take issue with fighting NCII, but cite concerns with the vagueness of the law's language, in that while the bill is written to target NCII, other legal content is not specifically exempted from the takedown enforcement. This could extend to non-public content stored on servers, such as the content of direct messages, and may require providers to break end-to-end encryption to be able to respond to takedown notices.

The notice and takedown system was also said to be subject to potential abuse by bad-faith actors to misrepresent themselves and take down legal content, as had been seen with the enforcement of the Digital Millennium Copyright Act (DMCA). While the DMCA has a mechanism for challenging takedown notices, the TAKE IT DOWN Act says takedown requestors should be acting in "good faith". The EFF also said that president Donald Trump has supported the bill but also that he would use it to his own ends to remove content critical of himself. This concern was coupled with the firing of the two Democratic commissioners on the FTC by Trump during the first months of his second term; the Cyber Civil Rights Initiative, supportive of the intent of the bill, said "Platforms that feel confident that they are unlikely to be targeted by the FTC (for example, platforms that are closely aligned with the current administration) may feel emboldened to simply ignore reports of NCII. Platforms attempting to identify authentic complaints may encounter a sea of false reports that could overwhelm their efforts and jeopardize their ability to operate at all."

== Related legislation ==
=== SHIELD Act ===
Senator Klobuchar had introduced, beginning in 2022, the Stopping Harmful Image Exploitation and Limiting Distribution (SHIELD) Act, which would bolster law enforcement tools to investigate and charge those that publish NCII with harsher penalties for NCII related to minors. The bill had passed through the Senate in 2024, but failed to pass through the House, but Klobuchar since reintroduced the bill in the Senate in February 2025.

=== DEFIANCE Act ===
Representative Alexandria Ocasio-Cortez has introduced the Disrupt Explicit Forged Images and Non-Consensual Edits (DEFIANCE) Act, which would provide victims of NCII the ability to seek civil damages from those that created the images. The bill has had bipartisan support in both houses, and while it had cleared the Senate in 2024, failed to pass the House. Ocasio-Cortez reintroduced the bill after the passage of TAKE IT DOWN in May 2025. The Senate passed the bill by unanimous consent in January 2026.

== See also ==
- Artificial intelligence controversies
- Fake nude photography
- Taylor Swift deepfake pornography controversy
