= Data (Use and Access) Act 2025 =

Act of the Parliament of the United Kingdom

Data (Use and Access) Act 2025 (Note: Section 144.)
- Act of Parliament
- Parliament of the United Kingdom
- Long title: An Act to make provision about access to customer data and business data; to make provision about services consisting of the use of information to ascertain and verify facts about individuals; to make provision about the recording and sharing, and keeping of registers, of information relating to apparatus in streets; to make provision about the keeping and maintenance of registers of births and deaths; to make provision for the regulation of the processing of information relating to identified or identifiable living individuals; to make provision about privacy and electronic communications; to establish the Information Commission; to make provision about information standards for health and social care; to make provision about the grant of smart meter communication licences; to make provision about the disclosure of information to improve public service delivery; to make provision about the retention of information by providers of internet services in connection with investigations into child deaths; to make provision about providing information for purposes related to the carrying out of independent research into online safety matters; to make provision about the retention of biometric data; to make provision about services for the provision of electronic signatures, electronic seals and other trust services; to make provision about works protected by copyright and the development of artificial intelligence systems; to make provision about the creation of purported intimate images; and for connected purposes.
- Citation: 2025 c. 18
- Territorial extent: England and Wales; Scotland; Northern Ireland; (Note: Section 141.)

Dates
- Royal assent: 19 June 2025
- Commencement: Various (Note: Section 142.)
Other legislation
Amends	Data Protection Act 2018; Births and Deaths Registration Act 1953; Registration Service Act 1953; New Roads and Street Works Act 1991; Social Security Administration Act 1992; Education Act 1996; Immigration, Asylum and Nationality Act 2006; Government of Wales Act 2006; Enterprise and Regulatory Reform Act 2013; Immigration Act 2014; Investigatory Powers Act 2016; Immigration Act 2016; Regulation EU 2016/679; Privacy and Electronic Communications (EC Directive) Regulations 2003; Sexual Offences Act 2003; Counter-Terrorism Act 2008; Digital Economy Act 2017; Sentencing Act 2020; Online Safety Act 2023

Status: Current legislation

Text of statute as originally enacted

Revised text of statute as amended

The Data (Use and Access) Act 2025 (c. 18) (DUAA) is an act of the Parliament of the United Kingdom concerned with data protection. The act makes changes primarily to the operation of the UK's General Data Protection Regulation ("UK GDPR") and the Data Protection Act 2018. The act passed into law on 19 June 2025.

The provisions of the act were brought into effect in stages: the initial implementation of certain aspects of the new law took effect on 19 and 20 August 2025, and the process was substantially complete by 23 June 2026. The Information Commissioner's Office (ICO) is responsible for publishing regulatory guidance on the act.

== Selected contents ==
=== National Underground Register ===
The act places on a statutory footing the National Underground Register, which is operated by Ordnance Survey and provides digital map of underground pipes and cables in England, Wales and Northern Ireland.

=== Creation of intimate images ===
The Sexual Offences Act 2003 is amended make an offence the creation, or the request for creation, of purported intimate images of another person who has not consented to this, for example by using generative AI. On 12 January 2026, technology minister Liz Kendall announced this would be brought into force that week, in response to the Grok AI image generation scandal.

=== Data protection complaints ===
Organisations must provide a way for people to raise a data protection complaint, which must be acknowledged within 30 days.

=== Online services used by children ===
An organisation providing an online service likely to be used by children must take children's needs into account when deciding how to use their data.
