= Forelock (film) =

American Film

- Film poster
- Directed by: Caleb Alexander Smith
- Written by: Caleb Alexander Smith
- Produced by: Lindsay McCormick; Russ Hammonds; David Krumholtz
- Starring: David Krumholtz; Emily Swallow; Caleb Alexander Smith; Jason Wiles; Alimi Ballard
- Cinematography: Roberto Schaefer
- Edited by: Ryan Denmark; Caleb Alexander Smith
- Production company: Midnight Chimes
- Distributed by: Mise-En-Scène Company
- Release date: August 8, 2025 (Austin Film Festival)
- Running time: 96 minutes
- Country: United States
- Language: English

Forelock is a 2025 American comedy film written and directed by Caleb Alexander Smith. A buddy romp set in L.A. starring Caleb Alexander Smith, and David Krumholtz,

== Premise ==
Caiden, an earnest fitness enthusiast, moves to Los Angeles hoping to become a personal trainer, but finds that people are distracted by his resemblance to the star of a superhero film franchise. He becomes entangled with Randy (David Krumholtz), a struggling Hollywood Boulevard impersonator caught in a dangerous scheme involving a drug dealer and a police investigation. Indie Spotlight described the film as a "master class in writing".

== Cast ==
- David Krumholtz as Randy
- Caleb Alexander Smith as Caiden
- Jason Wiles as Niko
- Emily Swallow as Sandra
- Anna Suzuki as Alicia Dixon

== Production ==
The film was in production March 8, 2024 and was one of the first films to shoot in Los Angeles after the SAG-AFTRA and WGA strikes of 2023, with David Krumholtz starring as "Randy" self described as his "Ratso Rizzo 'moment' ".The film was written and directed by Caleb Alexander Smith in his directorial debut.

== Release ==
Forelock premiered at the 32nd Austin Film Festival on October 23, 2025. It also screened at the inaugural New York Comedy Film Festival (NYCFF) in 2026. The Mise-En-Scène Company handles worldwide sales and launched the film to the market at both TIFF in 2025 and The European Film Market in 2026 where it was promoted with a "No AI Was Used" label.

== Reception ==
The Writer's Digest praised Forelock, writing that the film is a: "zany and incredibly fresh comedy" a "master class in writing" and saying "this indie darling is not one to pass up".
