= VGT3 =

Subsidiary of Amazon based in Palo Alto, California

Coordinates: 36.2685°N 115.0489°W

VGT3 is an Amazon facility in Las Vegas used for data harvesting and destructive book scanning to train large language models. Employees at VGT3 receive the books, cut their spines, and scan their pages, destroying the books in the process.

== Investigation ==
In July 2026, 404 Media placed an Apple AirTag in a rare book inside a 1,000 book shipment from a bookseller, and watched where it went. The book was transported from a California airport to Milwaukee, Kenosha (Wisconsin), Grand Junction (Colorado), and finally to an Amazon building, LAS8. The AirTag located the book at the north end of the LAS8 warehouse, which Amazon employees described as a separate operation named VGT3, with its logo on the door. Sudden bursts of book orders to the warehouse were reported as early as September 2024.

== See also ==
- Project Panama
