= Project Panama =

Digital piracy and destructive book scanning operation

Project Panama is a destructive book scanning operation started in early 2024 by the American artificial intelligence corporation Anthropic. Project Panama aims to develop a dataset of books for training Anthropic's large language models.

Prior to Project Panama, Anthropic used pirated books and was sued, agreeing in 2025 to pay $1.5 billion in a settlement. The class-action copyright lawsuit revealed the existence of Project Panama through unsealed court filings, in which it was described internally as an "effort to destructively scan all the books in the world". In the same 2025 litigation, Judge William Alsup ruled that Anthropic's use of legally purchased books for digitization and model training constituted fair use, in contrast to its prior use of pirated copies.

== Operation ==
Anthropic began by obtaining millions of previously digitized works through digital piracy. According to court documents, Anthropic used Books3, LibGen, and Pirate Library Mirror for this purpose, and may have acquired up to 7 million books in this way.

In 2025, Anthropic agreed to pay US$1.5 billion to settle Bartz v. Anthropic, a class-action lawsuit brought by authors over the piracy, and to destroy its pirated copies of the books. Authors usually received US$3,000 per book from this settlement.

Project Panama was started in early 2024, aiming to "destructively scan all the books in the world". Anthropic purchased millions of used books from online retailers such as Better World Books, World of Books, and Zoom Books. The company then sliced off their spines and scanned their pages in order to train its AI chatbot Claude. This process involved the use of hydraulic cutters for spine removal and high-speed document scanners. The paper was then recycled.

The dataset was then kept private and used only for training models. According to the Project Panama planning document, Anthropic did not "want it to be known that [it was] working on this".

In the same 2025 settlement, Judge William Alsup ruled that the destruction and digitization of legally purchased books constituted fair use, in contrast to Anthropic's prior use of pirated copies.

== See also ==
- VGT3 – Subsidiary of Amazon based in Palo Alto, California
