= The Mise En Scene Company =

British film company

The Mise en Scène Company, LTD
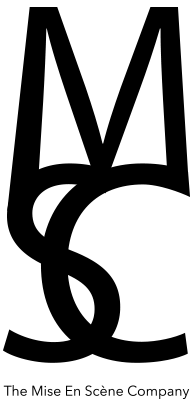

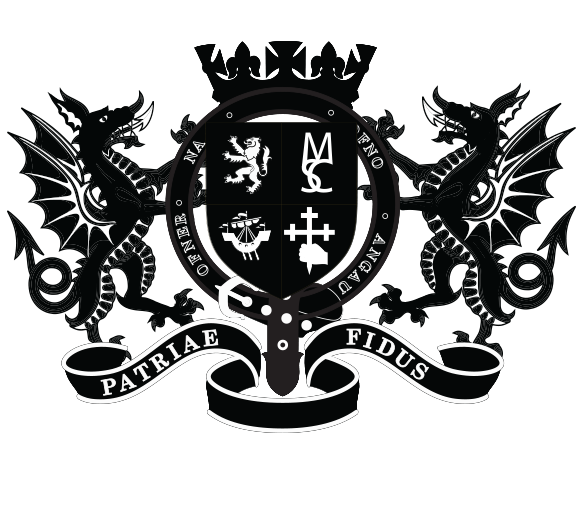
- Type: Private
- Industry: Film; Asset Management
- Founded: March 26, 2020; 6 years ago
- Founder: Paul S.L Yates
- Headquarters: London United Kingdom
- Number of locations: 3
- Area served: World
- Key people: Paul Stuart Lewis Yates (chairman and CEO)
- Products: Motion Pictures
- Services: Sales; Film distribution; Film production; Press relations; Consulting
- Number of employees: 5+
- Parent: The Mise En Scene Company Holdings
- Divisions: MSC Holdings; MSC Film; MSC Television
- Website: miseenscenecompany.com

The Mise en Scène Company, LTD (MSC) is an independent global film, multimedia and production company. MSC distributes and represents films in the United States, United Kingdom and internationally.

== Founding ==
MSC was founded by Paul Stuart Lewis Yates and Netto Fernandes, during a furlough from their jobs at The Ritz London hotel amidst the COVID-19 pandemic. This downtime has been attributed as catalyzing their efforts to launch the company. Although named after the cinematic term "mise en scène," the founders are quoted as being inspired by "mise en place" whilst they worked at the Ritz.

The Mise En Scène Company was launched in 2020 and debuted its first slate at the EFM.

Yates is a member of the aristocratic Lewis family. He spent just under a year living in Genova working for the global film sales company Devil Works, where he also had photography published in Il Giornale and writing published in the online magazine The Travel Club.

== Projects and acquisitions ==
MSC has managed global sales for several films. In 2021, it handled global sales for The True Don Quixote, starring Danny Huston, Jack Kilmer, Jacob Batalon and Tim Blake Nelson, the film was released by Signature Entertainment in the U.K. That same year, MSC also managed the global sales for American Reject, featuring Kathleen Monteleone and Tim O'Leary, at the Cannes Film Market. In 2022, it secured global sales for The Magnificent Meyersons, which stars Emmy-nominated actor Elizabeth Perkins and Jeff Perry . The company has also provided private consultation to producers. In 2024, MSC took on global sales for Driven, starring Rebecca Henderson and Liza Colón-Zayas.

In 2025 the company signed David Krumholtz starring in the film Forelock and announced a market screening at the Toronto International Film Festival, followed by the European Film Market in 2026. The company also signed Billy Knight starring Al Pacino. The company put a "no AI was used" self-certification notice on the posters of both films, and has called for an industry standard on such declarations.

== Distribution ==
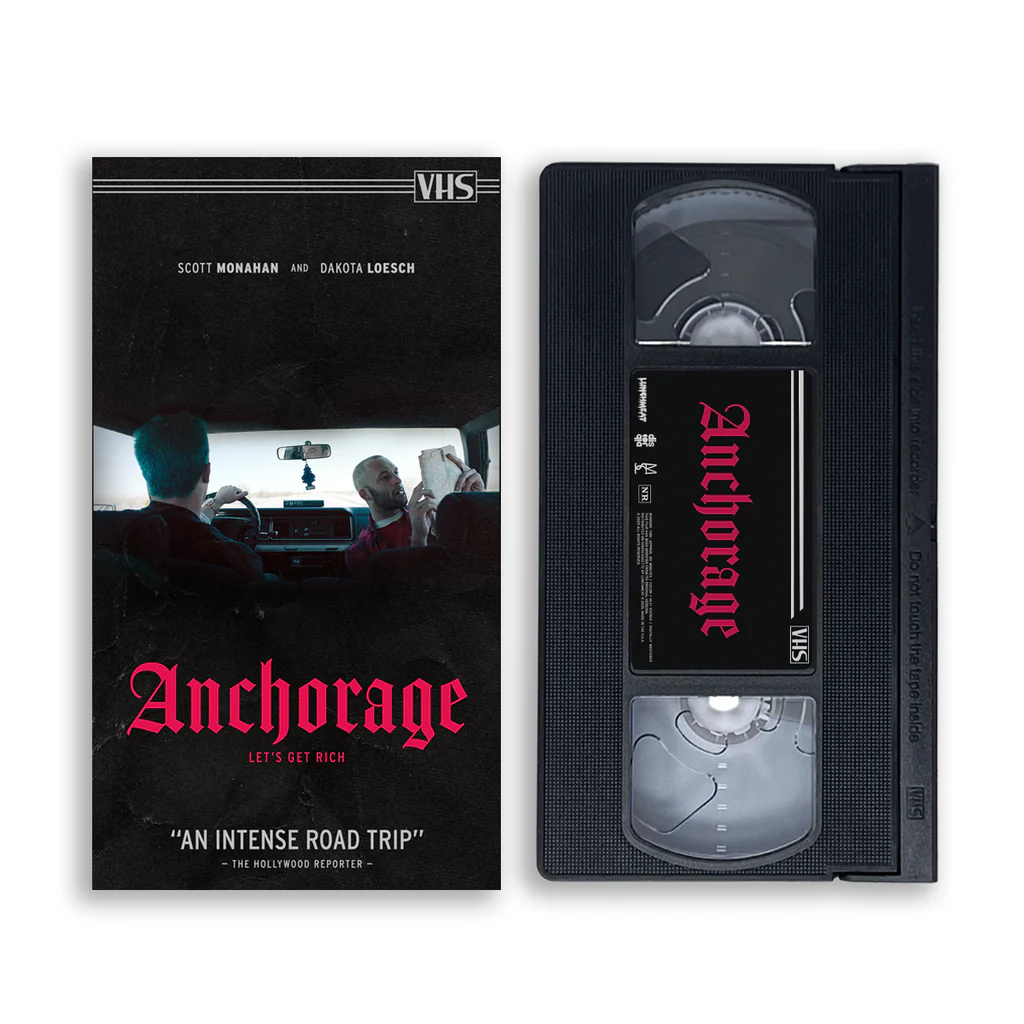
Anchorage MSC limited VHS run

In 2024 MSC coordinated a limited theatrical run in the US for The Magnificent Meyersons, brokered a tv/streaming deal with Starz, and coordinated airline sales and Latin American distribution.

In 2025 in partnership with Lunchmeat VHS and Discordia Anchorage was released on a limited VHS run.

== Film awards ==
- Festival Grand Prize - Best Film - Stony Brook Film Festival - Anchorage - 2021
- Best Film - Audience Award - Oldenburg Film Festival - Anchorage - 2021
- Seymour Cassel Award - Oldenburg Film Festival - Anchorage - 2021
- Audience Award - Laceno d'Oro International Film Festival - Anchorage - 2021
- Audience Award - Mammoth Film Festival - Anchorage - 2022
- Best Screenplay - New York Film Week - Anchorage - 2022
- Best Feature Film - Jim Thorpe Independent Film Festival - Anchorage - 2022
- Best Ensemble Cast - Culver City Film Festival - Anchorage - 2022
- Rising Star Award - New Orleans Film Festival - American Reject - 2020
- Best Actress - Las Vegas International Film & Screenplay Festival - American Reject - 2020
- Discovery Award - Super November - British Independent Film Awards - 2018
- Best Of The Fest - Auteur Theory - Breckenridge Festival of Film - 2000
