= Generative AI pornography =

Explicit material produced by generative AI

- Branch: Erotic art; Generative art; Computer art; Artificial intelligence art
- Years active: c. 2022–present
- Major figures: OpenAI
- Influences: Computer-generated imagery; Deepfake pornography
- Influenced: AI slop

Generative AI pornography is pornographic content produced using generative AI. It may include allusions towards animation, literature, video games and other forms of popular culture. The content may depict softcore pornography, including lascivious behavior, or more explicit material depicting sexual intercourse and erotic art. Such material may be original characters, or real people through deepfakes.

== Functions and production strategies ==
AI pornography platforms, beyond account creation and social media linking, primarily enable users to generate sexual images through feature selection or text prompting. Users can customize bodies, clothing, and sociodemographic traits, and browse categorized galleries of user‑generated content. Several sites also support short pornographic videos or GIFs and modification tools such as nudifiers, deepfakes, and facemorphing. Some platforms enable fine‑tuning of parameters such as settings, style, or theme, and provide prompt enhancers or suggestions to improve outputs. Users may edit generated images, refine prior prompts, modify others' work, or upload personal material as a basis, with iterative and collaborative content creation. Some websites additionally host interactive "erobots", customizable in real time for appearance, personality, memories, speech, and profession, enabling tailored sexual and non‑sexual interactions. Less common features include VR integration, AI porn games, audio or doodle prompts, and consensual replication of individuals with verification.

== History ==
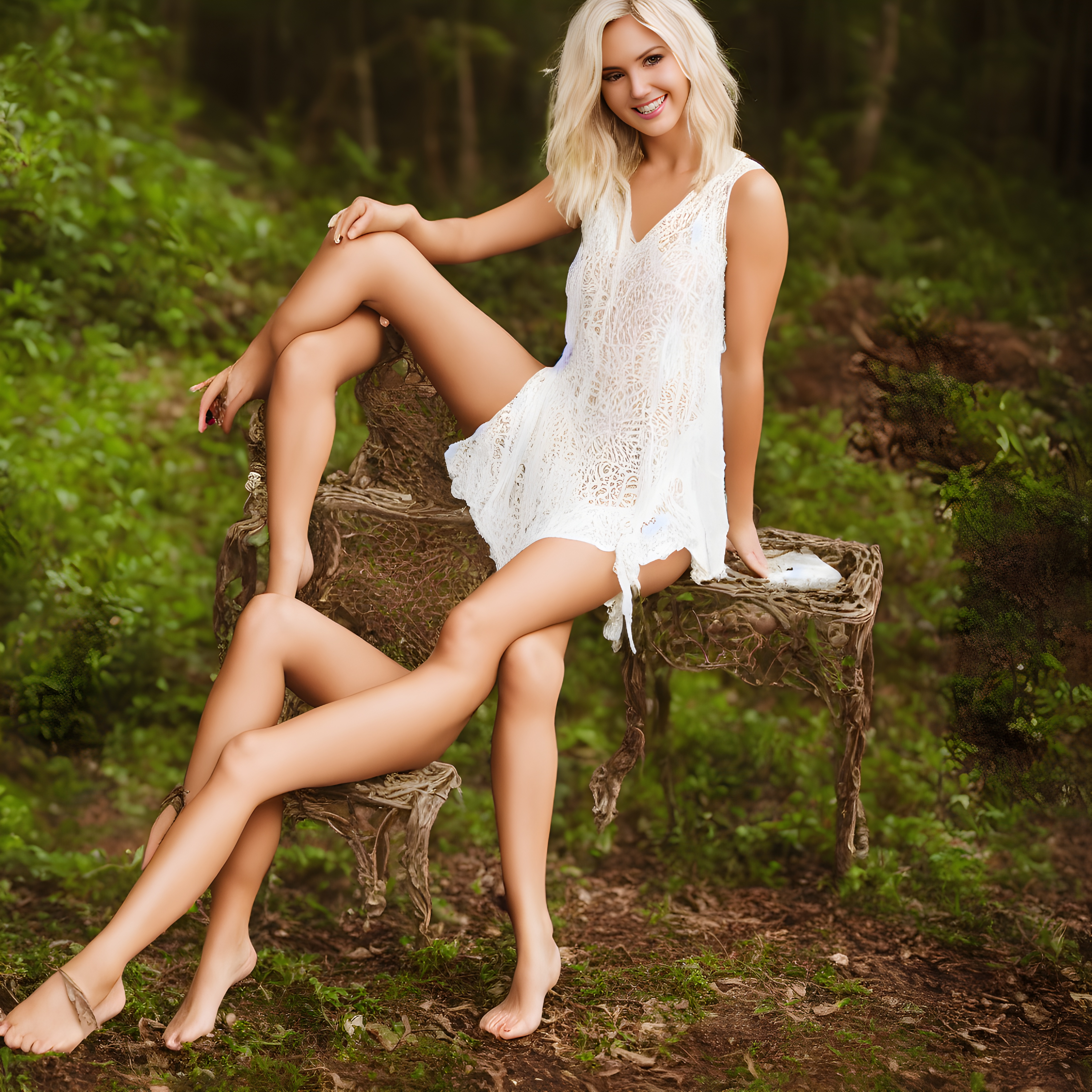
2023 AI-generated erotic image. Due to the early stages of AI development, the model hallucinated extra legs.

The use of generative artificial intelligence to create sexually explicit images emerged in 2022 on platforms such as Reddit and 4chan. AI-generated pornography became widespread in the early 2020s following Stability AI's release of Stable Diffusion (SD). This open-source model enables the creation of images from text prompts, utilizing the LAION-5B dataset. Following the model's public release, the volume of both explicit and non-explicit AI-generated media content increased. Due to the open-source nature of Stable Diffusion, there were no restrictions on image generation, which led to controversies regarding open-access AI and its use in generating explicit content. Over time, open-source AI models improved, enabling the creation of highly realistic images and intensifying calls for regulation in this area.

== Fields ==
=== AI-influencers ===
One application of generative AI technology is the creation of virtual influencers on platforms such as OnlyFans and Instagram. These characters interact with users, mimicking real human communication and providing a fully synthetic yet convincing experience. The emergence of such influencers has raised concerns regarding consent of individuals whose voices or likenesses were used as training data, as well as the fact that AI interactions blur the line between human-created content and AI-generated material.

=== AI porn websites ===
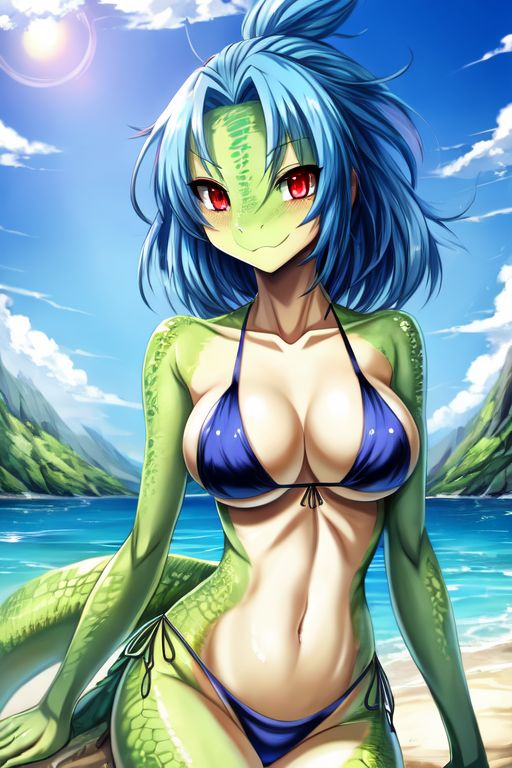
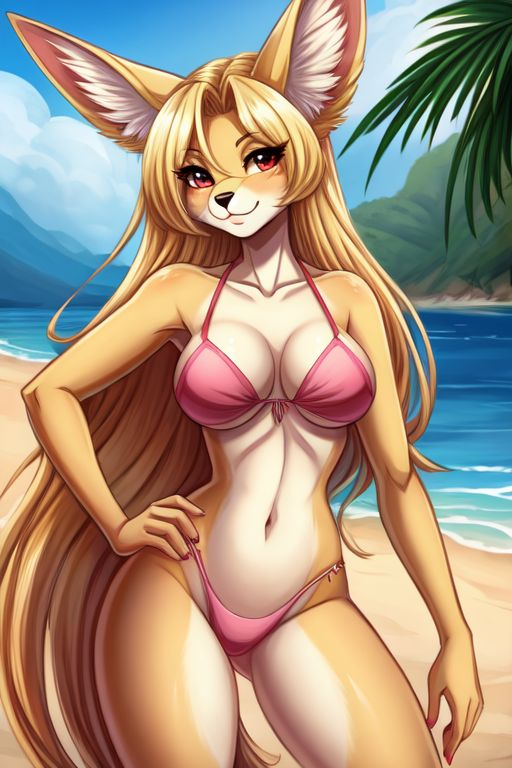
AI-generated erotic art of furry characters. Prompts are often used to generate images of specific fetishes.

Websites dedicated to erotic or pornographic AI-generated content primarily cater to an audience seeking personalized material. These platforms allow generating explicit content using various AI models or viewing content created by others. Tags are frequently used to refine search results, allowing users to find highly specific content by selecting attributes such as body type, facial features, sexual fetishes, general art styles, ranging from anime to realism, as well as art styles of specific artists. Many AI porn sites feature extensive image libraries and continuous feeds of user-generated content, with the ability to modify already generated images.

Generative AI pornography has also been reported to reproduce stereotypes and unrealistic depictions of LGBTQ people. There are concerns that using existing pornography as training data may reinforce harmful stereotypes and fetishization.

== Ethics ==
AI-generated pornography is highly controversial, igniting serious debate regarding the ethics of AI use and its regulation. AI technologies can be used to create deepfake pornography depicting real people without their consent, which can be used for blackmail or revenge porn. According to a 2023 analysis, 98% of deepfake videos found online are pornographic, with 99% of the victims being women. Celebrities who have fallen victim to deepfakes include Scarlett Johansson, Taylor Swift and Maisie Williams.

OpenAI is exploring the possibility of responsibly generating explicit content (such as erotica) while adhering to age restrictions, all while maintaining the ban on creating deepfakes. The Internet Watch Foundation has expressed concern regarding the potential use of AI to create child sexual abuse material. The Washington Post noted that while proprietary models such as ChatGPT have restrictions on generating erotic or pornographic content, such limitations are either absent or can be easily bypassed in local, open-source AI models like Stable Diffusion.

In 2026, researchers at the AI cybersecurity company Mindgard, reported that ChatGPT could be manipulated into generating sexualized and graphic imagery by using modified prompts. OpenAI implemented additional safeguards; however, the researchers found that modified prompts could still bypass these protections. A survey from Common Sense Media found that almost one in five teenagers had created AI-generated sexual content or knew someone who had. Nearly 70% expressed concern about becoming victims of non-consensual AI-generated sexual content.

=== AI undress ===
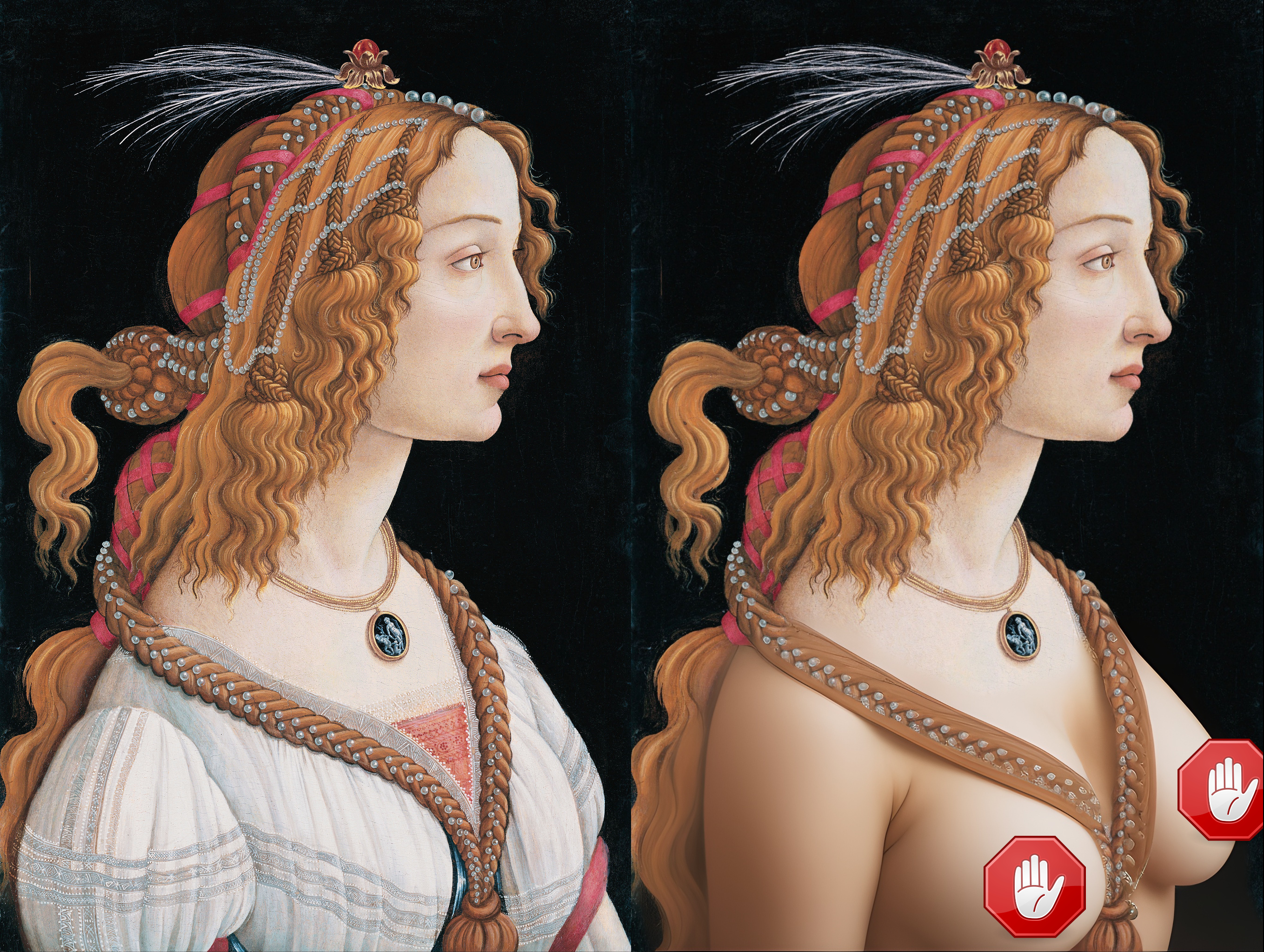
A drawing being digitally altered to appear nude, with subsequent censorship added afterward

AI can be used to create sexually explicit images and videos featuring unconsenting individuals, most often celebrities. 404 Media reported the existence of a Telegram bot for generating AI videos that has a monthly audience of over 100,000 users. In 2025, the Chinese technology company Alibaba released a video generation model called Wan 2.1, which was subsequently modified to remove guardrails, allowing generation of suggestive content.

=== Differences from deepfakes ===
Although AI-generated pornography and deepfake pornography rely on similar generative AI technologies, deepfakes involve altering existing content, usually photographs of unconsenting individuals, while AI-generated pornography usually synthesizes explicit content from scratch without using people's likenesses directly. Digital image analysis expert Hany Farid opined that, while deepfake pornography of unconsenting individuals should be illegal, the legal status of AI-generated pornography created from scratch is "more complex".

== Legality ==
The legality of AI-generated pornography remains an evolving issue. In some countries, laws concerning digital simulation may apply indirectly, particularly when the generated content features images of real people without their consent. Additionally, most existing laws regulate deepfake pornography of nonconsenting individuals, rather than fully synthesized AI pornography.

== See also ==
- Artificial intelligence controversies
