= Graphika =

American media analysis company

Graphika is an American social network analysis company known for tracking online disinformation. It was established in 2013.

== History ==
Graphika was founded in 2013 by John Kelly, a computational social scientist with a PhD from Columbia University. It is based in New York.

Graphika has identified disinformation campaigns by the Internet Research Agency, a Russian troll farm, targeting voters in the 2016 and 2020 United States presidential elections and the 2022 elections. It has also uncovered Chinese-linked disinformation campaigns, such as a network of fake social media accounts promoting misinformation about COVID-19 vaccines in 2020 and deepfake news anchors promoting pro-China propaganda in 2023.

In 2023, Graphika identified an influence operation targeting voters in the 2024 Taiwanese presidential election. In 2024, it traced the creation of deepfake pornographic images of Taylor Swift back to a 4chan community.

== Operation ==
Graphika says it relies on artificial intelligence to analyze online communities and identify coordinated operations.

Graphika works with companies such as Google, Facebook and Twitter. It has stated that it provides intelligence to the companies it works with, so that they can make their own strategic decisions.

== See also ==
- Associated Press
