= The Most Hated Man on the Internet =

2022 Netflix docuseries

- Poster
- Genre: Documentary; True crime
- Directed by: Rob Miller
- Starring: Charlotte Laws; Kayla Laws; Charles Parselle; James McGibney
- Composer: David Schweitzer
- Country of origin: United States
- Original language: English

Production
- Executive producers: Adam Hawkins; Alexander Marengo
- Producer: Vikki Miller
- Cinematography: Ryan Earl Parker
- Production company: Raw TV

Original release
- Release: July 27, 2022

The Most Hated Man on the Internet is a 2022 American three-part Netflix docuseries that covers the story of Hunter Moore and his website Is Anyone Up?, a pornographic site based on stolen and hacked photos, and the struggle to take the website down. It focuses on the story of Charlotte Laws as she tries to remove her daughter's nude photos from the website.

== Overview ==
The Most Hated Man on the Internet follows anti-revenge porn activists in their efforts to take down the website IsAnyoneUp.com. Created by Hunter Moore, the website was built so anyone can post a picture of anyone and connect it to their social media accounts. Charlotte Laws started a campaign to try to take it down after her daughter's nude photos were shared on the website.

The documentary is separated into three episodes. It is directed by Rob Miller, an employee of Netflix. The three episodes are made up of interviews of the main roles in the site except Hunter Moore. Hunter originally was willing to be featured and interviewed for the documentary but later declined for unknown reasons.

== Reception ==
On the review aggregator website Rotten Tomatoes, 88% of 16 critics' reviews are positive. The website's consensus reads: "Focusing on a truly repellent real-life villain, The Most Hated Man on the Internet's dive through some of the most sordid corners of the web is redeemed by a satisfying through line of justice served."

Brian Lowry of CNN wrote, "The Most Hated Man on the Internet faces a bit of a logistical problem: How to visually represent the kind of photos that were posted by the 'revenge porn' site IsAnyoneUp.com without invading people's privacy all over again. Creatively tackling that, the producers deliver a highly watchable if salacious three-part docuseries, fueled by its truly hissable, made-for-TV villain." The Hollywood Reporter's Angie Han wrote, "The docuseries' three hourlong episodes go by quickly, thanks to its streamlined storytelling and brisk pacing, and it delivers on both the white-hot outrage and the grim satisfaction promised by the downfall of a dude who really had it coming. But The Most Hated Man on the Internet falls short of the ambition needed to lend it real, lasting heft." Randy Myers of The Mercury News gave the series 3.5/4 stars, writing, "Director Rob Miller never wastes time, keeping it direct and to the point in a story that jumps to various locales including San Francisco, where Moore lived with his ex-girlfriend... and to other cities where we're introduced to his exploited victims as well as those trying to stop him."

Anita Singh of The Daily Telegraph was more critical, writing, "why dredge this up a decade on, bringing [Moore] back into public consciousness? The show is rated 18 and it's full of truly unpleasant things that I shan't list here. Could it be that Netflix thinks people will enjoy the salacious details and is repackaging the awful content under the guise of a cautionary tale?" She gave it a score of 2/5 stars. The Irish Independent's Pat Stacey expressed similar sentiments, asking, "Does it serve any purpose beyond turning the spotlight back on a loathsome individual who deserves to be forgotten, but now finds himself part of the conversation again?"
