= Revenge =

Harmful action against a person or group in response to a grievance

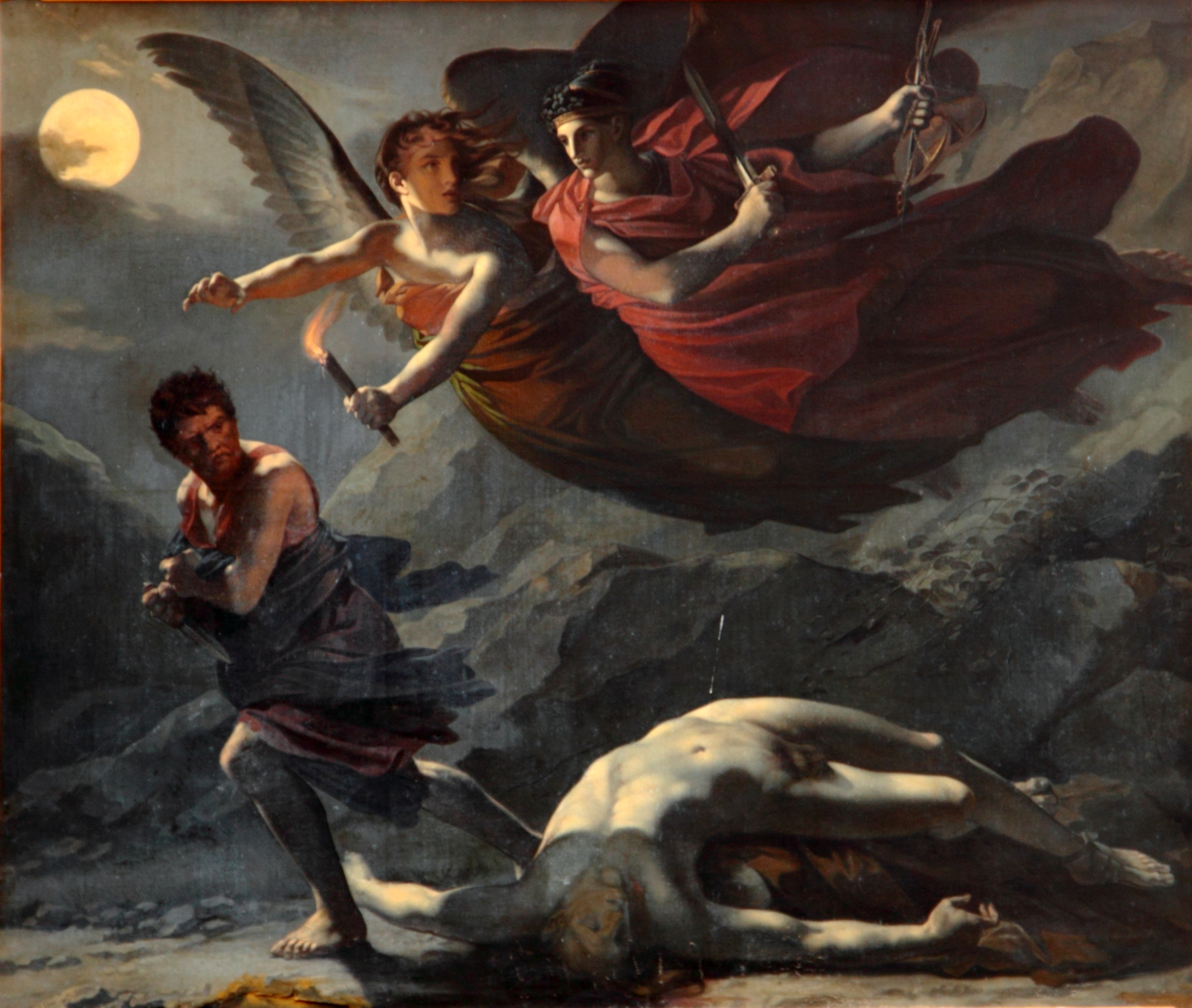
Justice and Divine Vengeance Pursuing Crime by Pierre-Paul Prud'hon, c. 1805–1808

Revenge is an act against a person or group in response to a grievance, be it real or perceived. Vengeful forms of justice, such as primitive justice or retributive justice, are often differentiated from more formal and refined forms of justice such as distributive justice or restorative justice.

== Function in society ==
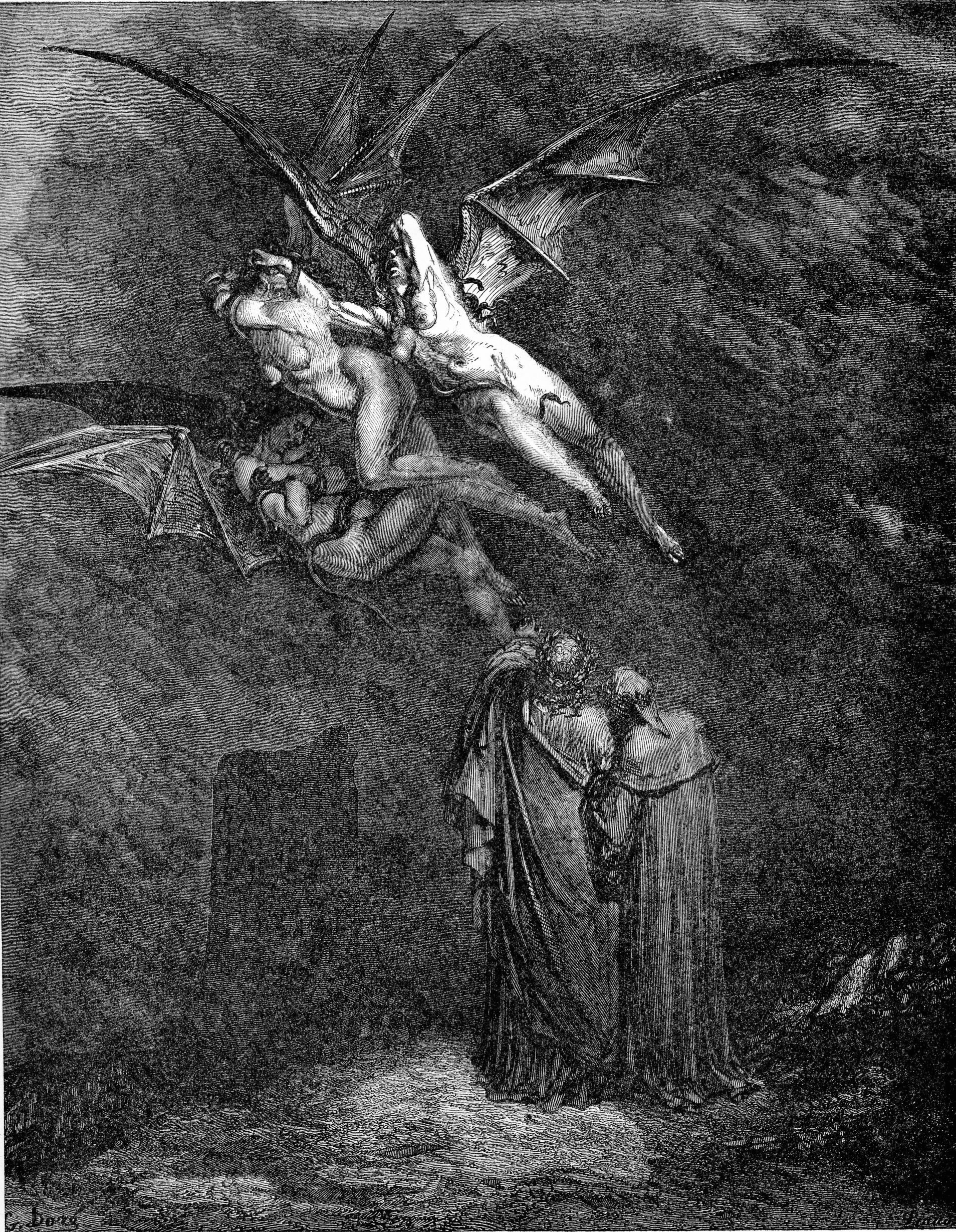
Engraving by Gustave Doré illustrating the Erinyes, chthonic deities of vengeance and death

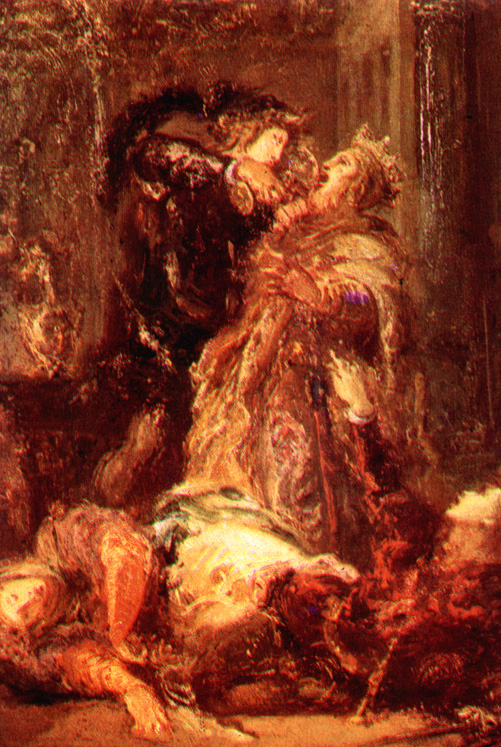
Shakespeare's Hamlet tells a history in which a man avenged the murder of his father by killing his uncle. Artist: Gustave Moreau.

Social psychologist Ian McKee states that the desire for the sustenance of power motivates vengeful behavior as a means of impression management: "People who are more vengeful tend to be those who are motivated by power, by authority and by the desire for status. They don't want to lose face".

Vengeful behavior has been found across a majority of human societies throughout history. Some societies encourage vengeful behavior, which is then called a feud. These societies usually regard the honor of individuals and groups as of central importance. Thus, while protecting their reputation, an avenger feels as if they restore the previous state of dignity and justice. According to Michael Ignatieff, "Revenge is a profound moral desire to keep faith with the dead, to honor their memory by taking up their cause where they left off". Thus, honor may become a heritage that passes from generation to generation. Whenever it is compromised, the affected family or community members might feel compelled to retaliate against an offender to restore the initial "balance of honor" that preceded the perceived injury. This cycle of honor might expand by bringing the family members and then the entire community of the new victim into the brand-new, endless cycle of revenge that may pervade generations.

== History ==
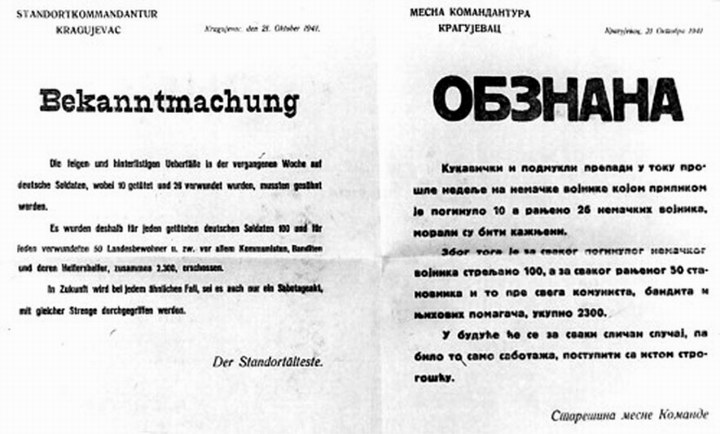
German announcement of killing 2300 civilians in Kragujevac massacre as retaliation for 10 killed German soldiers. Nazi-occupied Serbia, 1941.

Francis Bacon described revenge as a kind of "wild justice" that "does [..]. offend the law [and] putteth the law out of office."

Feuds are cycles of provocation and retaliation, fueled by a desire for revenge and carried out over long periods of time by familial or tribal groups. They were an important part of many pre-industrial societies, especially in the Mediterranean region. They still persist in some areas, notably in Albania with its tradition of gjakmarrja or "blood feuds", revenge that is carried out not only by the individual, but by their extended relations for generations to come.

Blood feuds are still practised in many parts of the world, including Kurdish regions of Turkey and in Papua New Guinea.

In Japan, honouring one's family, clan, or lord through the practice of revenge killings is called "katakiuchi" (敵討ち). These killings could also involve the relatives of an offender. Today, katakiuchi is most often pursued by peaceful means, but revenge remains an important part of Japanese culture.

== Social psychology ==
Philosophers tend to believe that to punish and to take revenge are vastly different activities: "One who undertakes to punish rationally does not do so for the sake of the wrongdoing, which is now in the past - but for the sake of the future, that the wrongdoing shall not be repeated, either by him, or by others who see him, or by others who see him punished". In contrast, seeking revenge is motivated by a yearning to see a transgressor suffer; revenge is necessarily preceded by anger, whereas punishment does not have to be.

Indeed, Kaiser, Vick, and Major point out the following: "An important psychological implication of the various efforts to define revenge is that there is no objective standard for declaring an act to be motivated by revenge or not. Revenge is a label that is ascribed based on perceivers’ attributions for the act. Revenge is an inference, regardless of whether the individuals making the inference are the harmdoers themselves, the injured parties, or outsiders. Because revenge is an inference, various individuals can disagree on whether the same action is revenge or not."

Belief in the just-world fallacy is also associated with revenge: in particular, having strong experiences or challenges against, can increase distress and motivate individuals to seek revenge, as a means of justice restoration.

A growing body of research reveals that a vengeful disposition is correlated to adverse health outcomes: strong desires for revenge and greater willingness to act on these desires have been correlated with post-traumatic stress disorder symptoms and psychiatric morbidity.

James Kimmel, Jr., a lecturer in psychiatry at the Yale School of Medicine and founder of the Yale Collaborative for Motive Control Studies, has argued that revenge operates as a behavioral addiction, with neuroimaging studies showing that revenge desires activate the same neural pleasure and reward circuitry associated with substance use disorders. According to this model, revenge cravings can become compulsive and uncontrollable despite negative consequences, paralleling the progression from casual drug use to addiction.

== Proverbs ==
The popular expression "revenge is a dish best served cold" suggests that revenge is more satisfying if enacted when unexpected or long-feared, inverting traditional civilized revulsion toward "cold-blooded" violence.

The idea's origin is obscure. The French diplomat Charles Maurice de Talleyrand-Périgord (1754–1838) has been credited with the saying, "La vengeance est un met que l'on doit manger froid" ["Revenge is a dish that must be eaten cold"], albeit without supporting detail. The concept has been in the English language at least since the 1846 translation of the 1845 French novel Mathilde by Joseph Marie Eugène Sue: "la vengeance se mange très bien froide", there italicized as if quoting a proverbial saying, and translated "revenge is very good eaten cold". The phrase has been wrongly credited to the novel Les Liaisons dangereuses (1782).

The phrase has also been credited to the Pashtuns of Afghanistan.

Earlier speakers of English might use the set phrase "with a wanion" rather than the more modern standard "with a vengeance" to express intensity.

A Japanese proverb states, "If you want revenge, then dig two graves". While this reference is frequently misunderstood by Western audiences, the Japanese reader understands that this proverb means that enactors of revenge must be more dedicated to killing their enemy than to surviving the ordeal themselves.

== In art ==
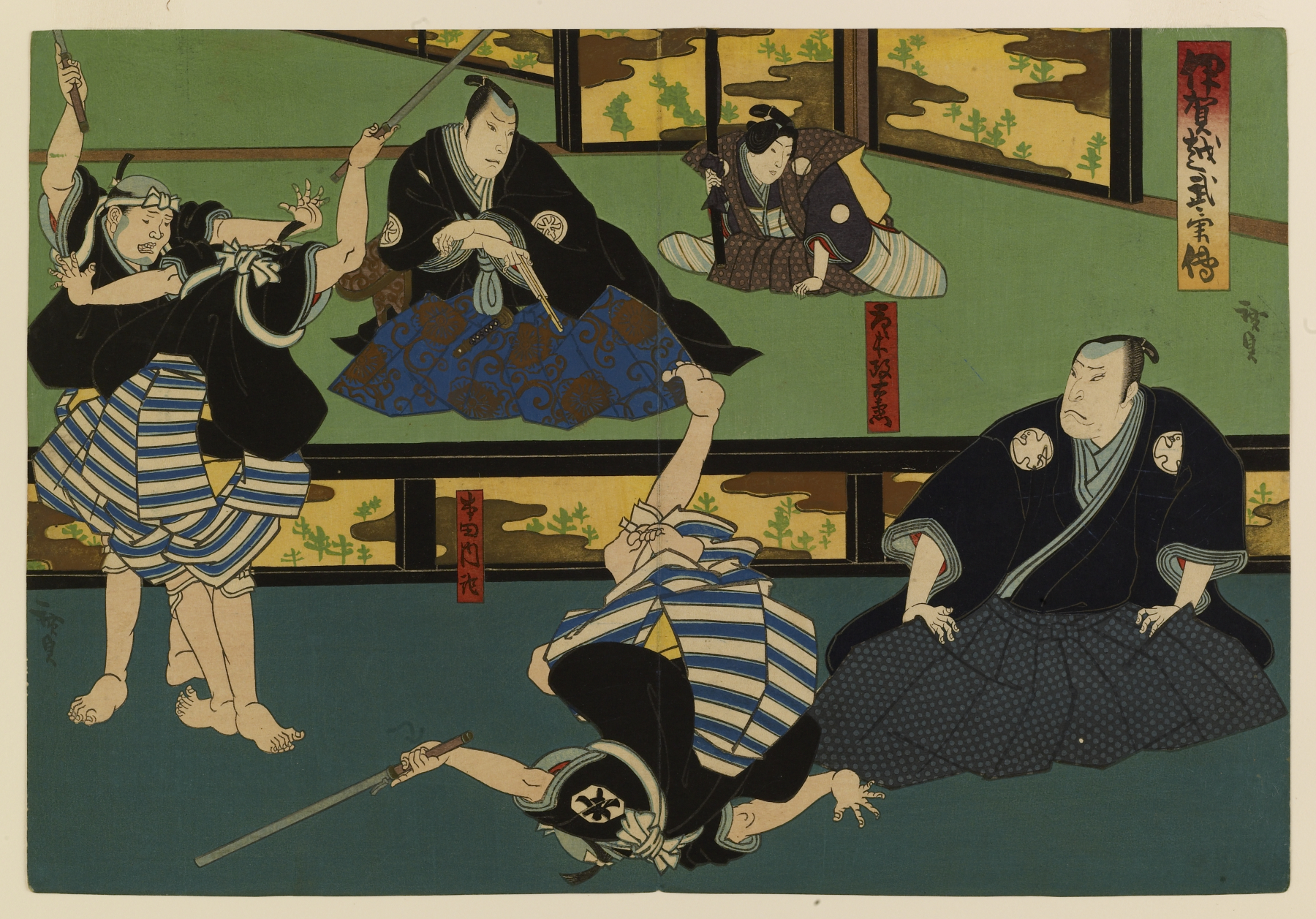
Igagoe buyuden. This is an episode from a popular story of revenge – how the son of a murdered samurai tracked the killer over all Japan.

Revenge is a popular subject across many forms of art. Some examples include the painting Herodias' Revenge by Juan de Flandes and the operas Don Giovanni and The Marriage of Figaro, both by Wolfgang Amadeus Mozart. In Japanese art, revenge is a theme in various woodblock prints depicting the forty-seven rōnin by many well-known and influential artists, including Utagawa Kuniyoshi. The Chinese playwright Ji Junxiang used revenge as the central theme in his theatrical work The Orphan of Zhao; it depicts more specifically familial revenge, which is placed in the context of Confucian morality and social hierarchical structure.

== In literature ==
Revenge has been a popular literary theme historically and continues to play a role in contemporary works. Examples of literature that feature revenge as a theme include the plays Hamlet and Othello by William Shakespeare, the novel The Count of Monte Cristo by Alexandre Dumas, and the short story "The Cask of Amontillado" by Edgar Allan Poe. More modern examples include the novels Carrie by Stephen King, Gone Girl by Gillian Flynn, and The Princess Bride by William Goldman. Although revenge is a theme in itself, it is also considered to be a genre.

Revenge as a genre has been consistent with a variety of themes that have frequently appeared in different texts over the last few centuries. Such themes include but are not limited to: disguise, masking, sex, cannibalism, the grotesque, bodily fluids, power, violent murders, and secrecy. Each theme is usually coupled with the concept of dramatic irony. Dramatic irony is a literary device in which the audience possesses knowledge unavailable to characters in a novel, play, or film. Its purpose is to intensify the tragic events that are going to unfold by creating tension between the audience and the actions of the characters.

The most common theme within the genre of revenge is the recurring violent murders that take place throughout the text, especially in the final act or scene. The root of the violence is usually derived from the characters' childhood development.

The themes of masking and disguise have the ability to go hand in hand with each other. A character may employ disguise literally or metaphorically. A mask is the literal example of this theme; while pretending to be something one is not is considered to be the metaphoric example. Additional themes that may cause the protagonist and antagonist to develop a masked or disguised identity include sex, power, and even cannibalism. Examples of sex and power being used as themes can be seen in the novel Gone Girl by Gillian Flynn, as well as the aforementioned drama, Titus Andronicus.

== On the internet ==
The emergence of the internet has provided new ways of enacting revenge. For example, customer revenge targets businesses and corporations with the intent to cause damage or harm. In general, people tend to place more credence in online reviews rather than corporate communications. With technology becoming more readily available, corporations and firms are more likely to experience damage caused by negative reviews posted online going viral. Recent studies indicate this type of consumer rage aimed at corporations is becoming more common, especially in Western societies.

The rise of social media sites like Facebook, Twitter, and YouTube act as public platforms for exacting new forms of revenge. Revenge porn involves the vengeful public dissemination of intimate pictures and videos of another person's sexual activity with the intent of creating widespread shame. Participation in online revenge porn activities incites a sense of pleasure through the harm, embarrassment, and humiliation being inflicted on the victim. The allowance of anonymity on revenge porn sites encourages further incivility by empowering and encouraging this type of behavior. In many instances, the original poster provides the victim's personal information, including links to social media accounts, furthering the harassment. Online revenge porn's origins can be traced to 2010 when Hunter Moore created the first site, IsAnyoneUp, to share nude photos of his girlfriend.

== In other animals ==
Humans are not the only species known to take revenge. There are several species such as camels, elephants, fish, lions, coots, crows, and many species of primates (chimpanzees, macaques, baboons, etc.) that have been recognized to seek revenge. Primatologists Frans de Waal and Lesleigh Luttrell have conducted numerous studies that provide evidence of revenge in many species of primates. They observed chimpanzees and noticed patterns of revenge. For example, if chimpanzee A helped chimpanzee B defeat his opponent, chimpanzee C, then chimpanzee C would be more likely to help chimpanzee A's opponent in a later squabble. Chimpanzees are one of the most common species that show revenge due to their desire for dominance. Studies have also been performed on species assumed to be less cognitive such as fish to demonstrate that not only those considered intellectual animals execute revenge. Studies of crows by Professor John Marzluff have also shown that some animals can carry "blood feuds" in similar ways to humans. Using a "dangerous" mask to cover their face and trap, band, and then release crows, Marzluff observed that within two weeks, a significant percentage of crows encountered - 26%, to be exact - would "scold" the people wearing the dangerous mask, proving that crows pass information pertaining to feuds within their family units to spread awareness about dangers they may face. This included crows not initially trapped by the mask-wearing researchers, seeing as some of the crows were un-banded. This was further proven three years after the initial study, as the percentage of "scolding" crows increased to 66% from the initial 26%.

== See also ==
- Anger
- Crime of passion
- Cycle of violence
- Dirty Work (1998 film)
- Divine retribution
- Eye for an eye
- Frontier justice
- Guilt–shame–fear spectrum of cultures
- Honor killing
- Just-world fallacy
- Karma
- Lawsuit
- Nemesis (mythology)
- Proportionality (law)
- Punishment
- Reprisal
- Retributive justice
- Revenge dress
- Schadenfreude
- Two wrongs make a right
- Vengeful ghost
- Vigilantism
- War
