= Am I in Porn? =

German facial recognition search engine

- Website type: Search engine
- Available in: English, French, German, Spanish, Chinese, and Portuguese
- Founders: Lukas Henseleit; Jonas Schnabel; Yannick Schuchmann
- Website: amiinporn.org
- Registration: Yes
- Launched: 2018

Am I in Porn? is a non-profit picture-based search engine built to allow people to search for and take action against online content uploaded without their permission. It aims to help victims of revenge porn to find content and take it down.

== History ==
Am I in Porn? was founded by Lukas Henseleit, Jonas Schnabel and Yannick Schuchmann in 2018 after a member of their friendship group became a victim of revenge porn.

In 2020, the website became public and has helped many victims remove explicit content from pornographic sites.

== Service ==
Users are able to visit the website and upload a picture of themselves. In the next step, the algorithm will examine the photo and make comparisons to its database of over ten million videos. Up to 30 results links will be returned, ranked by how likely they are to have a match to the submitted image.

The service does not keep a record of the photograph and the user's identity is protected.

If any pornographic content resembling the uploaded image is located, the user will be notified and a detailed set of instructions on how to delete the offending material from the sites is provided. In addition, the user will be provided with resources for obtaining both mental health and legal assistance.

== Criticism ==
Erotic portals are concerned that individuals may use them to locate pornographic material for acquaintances. They believe that individuals may use third-party images to obtain information about individuals, and may potentially misuse any content discovered. The General Data Protection Regulation explicitly forbids the processing of biometric data to identify people and “the right to own the picture” specifically forbids the use of images without explicit consent from people portrayed. Stefan Brink, Baden-Wüttembergs Regional Data Protection Officer, has claimed that the website is operating illegally.
