= Mary Anne Franks =

American jurist

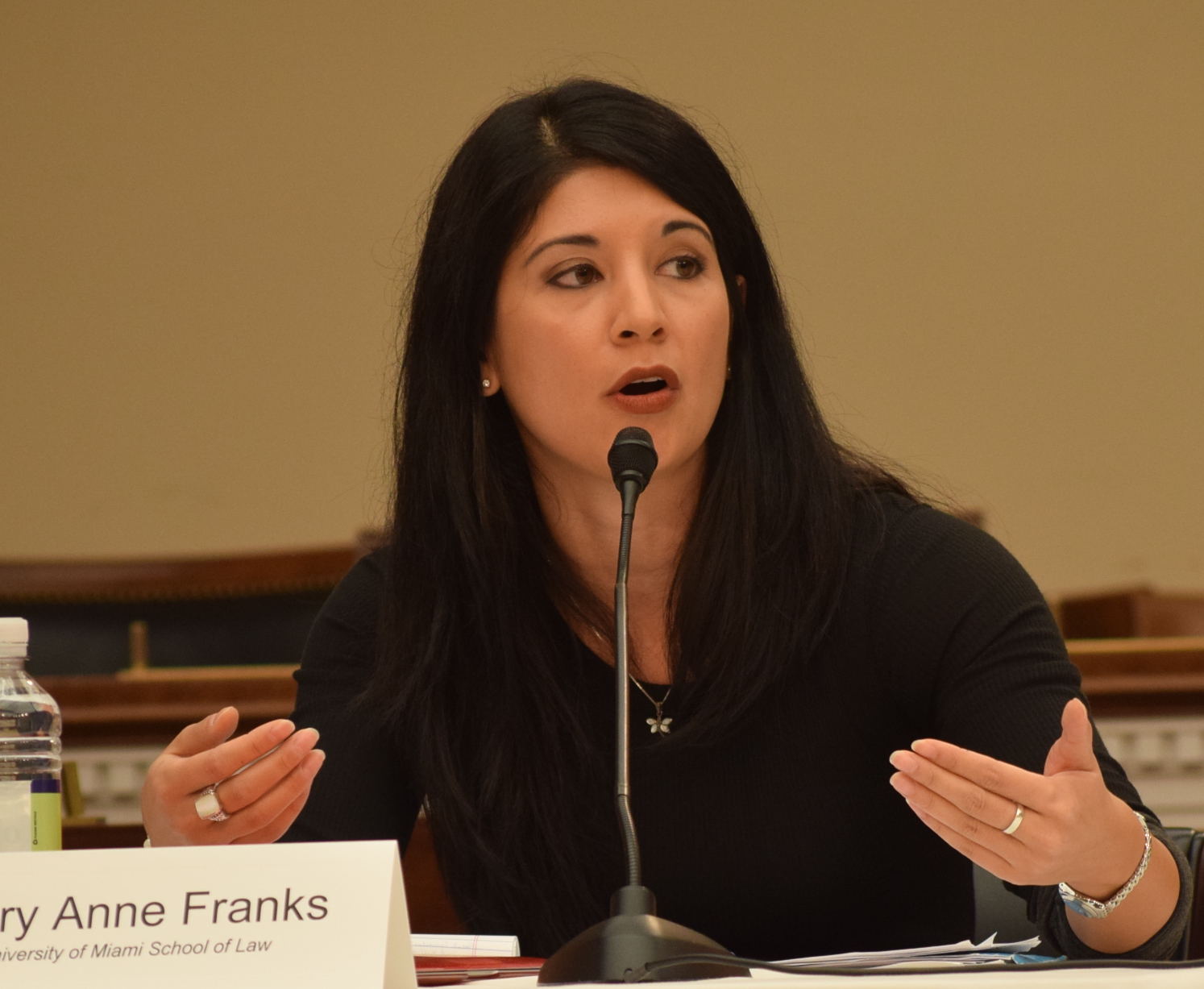
- Franks in 2014
- Education: Loyola University New Orleans (BA); University of Oxford (MPhil, DPhil); Harvard University (JD)
- Employer: George Washington University Law School at George Washington University
- Organization: Cyber Civil Rights Initiative
- Notable work: The Cult of the Constitution: Our Deadly Devotion to Guns and Free Speech (Stanford Press, 2019)

Mary Anne Franks is an American legal scholar, author, activist, and pundit. She is a professor of law and the Eugene L. and Barbara A. Bernard Professor in Intellectual Property, Technology, and Civil Rights Law at George Washington University Law School, where her areas of expertise and teaching include First Amendment law, Second Amendment law, criminal law, criminal procedure, family law, and law and technology. She also serves as president and Legislative and Technology Policy Director of the Cyber Civil Rights Initiative. Prior to joining the faculty at George Washington University Law School, Franks was the Michael R. Klein Distinguished Scholar Chair and Professor of Law at the University of Miami School of Law.

Franks is the author of The Cult of the Constitution: Our Deadly Devotion to Guns and Free Speech, which won a gold medal at the 2020 Independent Publisher Book Awards as well as the 2020 Association of American Publishers PROSE Award for Legal Studies and Excellence in Social Sciences. Her second book, Fearless Speech, was published in 2024.

== Early life and education ==
Mary Anne Franks was born in Indiana on September 27, 1977 to Kang Tu-Kwei, a Taiwanese woman, and Jesse Franks, an American World War II veteran who died when Mary was two years old.

After her father's death, Franks spent most of her childhood in Pine Bluff, Arkansas, a location that Franks described as "not the most racially sensitive place." She attended Loyola University New Orleans, where she graduated with highest honors in 1999 with a bachelor's degree in philosophy and English literature with a minor in classics.

She was awarded a Rhodes Scholarship in 1998. At the University of Oxford, she earned her M.Phil. in European literature, with distinction, in June 2001 and her D.Phil. in modern languages and literature in January 2004. Her examination field of continental philosophy, psychoanalytic theory, gender theory, and political theory culminated in her doctoral thesis, "Enjoying Women: Sex, Psychoanalysis, and the Political."

In 2007, Franks graduated cum laude from Harvard Law School, where she served as senior executive editor of the Harvard Journal of Law & Gender and executive editor of the Harvard Human Rights Journal. During her time in law school, she received several awards, including the Harvard Law School Association Alumnae Fellowship, Reginald Lewis International Internship, the Chayes International Public Service Fellow in 2005, and the National Association of Women Lawyers Outstanding Law School Student Award in 2007.

== Career ==
From 2004 to 2005, Franks taught courses in ethics, world religions, and introductory philosophy within the Department of Humanities at Quincy College in Massachusetts. During her time at Harvard Law School, Franks clerked for the Office of the Prosecutor at the International Criminal Court. She also worked from 2005 to 2008 as a lecturer in the Department of Social Studies and as a teaching fellow in the government, philosophy, and English departments. From 2008 to 2010, she was a Bigelow Fellow and lecturer in law at the University of Chicago Law School as well as a faculty affiliate at the Center for Gender Studies.

Franks taught at the University of Miami School of Law from 2010 to 2023. From 2010 to 2015, Franks served as an associate professor of law and was promoted to professor of law in 2015. In 2013, she served as a visiting professor at the University of Navarra in Pamplona, Spain. In 2019, Franks was recognized as a Dean's Distinguished Scholar for the Profession, an honor bestowed upon University of Miami School of Law faculty members whose scholarly contributions to the legal profession are deemed significant and influential. In 2021, she was appointed to the Michael R. Klein Distinguished Scholar Chair "to recognize her substantial contributions and ongoing accomplishments in scholarship and advocacy at the confluence of civil rights and technology."

Since 2013, Franks has worked in various capacities with the Cyber Civil Rights Initiative (CCRI), a nonprofit organization that seeks to combat cyberharassment, nonconsensual pornography, and online abuse through legislation, technology policy reform, and victim support. From 2014 to 2018, she served as CCRI's vice president. Since 2018, she has served as CCRI's president. In addition, she has served as CCRI's Legislative & Tech Policy Director since its founding.

Franks is licensed to practice law in the District of Columbia.

In October 2022, Franks joined the Council for Responsible Social Media project launched by Issue One to address the negative mental, civic, and public health impacts of social media in the United States, co-chaired by former House Democratic Caucus leader Dick Gephardt and former Massachusetts Lieutenant Governor Kerry Healey.

In 2023, Franks joined the faculty of George Washington University Law School as Eugene L. and Barbara A. Bernard Professor in Intellectual Property, Technology, and Civil Rights Law.

=== Scholarship ===
Franks's scholarly work focuses on online harassment, free speech, discrimination, and violence. Franks also writes for various news media outlets, including The New York Times, The Washington Post, The Atlantic, and The Guardian. She has been a regular contributor to The Huffington Post. As a frequent legal commentator in the media on cyberlaw and criminal law issues, Franks has been quoted in such publications as The New York Times, The Wall Street Journal, The Washington Post, and The New Yorker, and she has appeared on CNN, the Today show, and Vice News. Franks is a co-producer of the 2015 film Hot Girls Wanted, a documentary produced by actress Rashida Jones that examines the "professional amateur" porn industry.

Franks's work in advocating for legislative, technological, and social reform on the issue of nonconsensual pornography ("revenge porn") has been instrumental in drafting recent state legislation against the practice in the United States. She has worked with Congresswoman Jackie Speier on a federal criminal bill titled the Intimate Privacy Protection Act (IPPA), which evolved into the ENOUGH Act and again into the SHIELD Act. The SHIELD Act is now part of the Violence Against Women Reauthorization Act of 2021, which the U.S. House of Representatives passed with bipartisan support in March 2021. Franks also advises major technology companies on their privacy and abuse policies. In 2015, several major tech companies, most notably Google, announced they would be adding to their privacy and removal policies sexually explicit images published without consent. In 2014, Franks was named a Hero in the Fight to Save the Internet by The Daily Dot.

== Personal life ==
Franks is Taiwanese American.

In addition to her work in legal scholarship and activism, she is an instructor in Krav Maga, a self-defense system developed for the military in Israel. On the topic of women's empowerment through the honing of self-defense skills, Franks said, "Society puts a lot of focus on women as objects, as opposed to women's asserting their subjecthood. I'm concerned with ways that women can create a relationship with their bodies that's about making them stronger, faster, as well as more secure." She is also a vocal proponent of hand-to-hand self-defense techniques over the use of firearms: "What troubles me about Florida when it comes to the psychology of self-defense is that our answer for defending ourselves is always a gun. Krav Maga is a nuanced approach to defending oneself and protecting one's space. You can respond effectively, but no one gets shot, no one dies."

== Selected works ==
Articles

- Dean, Michelle (2012). "The Story of Amanda Todd". The New Yorker (quoted). Archived from the original on July 13, 2015.
- Franks, Mary Anne (December 18, 2013). "The Lawless Internet? Myths and Misconceptions About CDA Section 230". The Huffington Post. Archived from the original on August 14, 2015.
- Franks, Mary Anne (February 23, 2014). "We need new laws to put a stop to revenge porn". The Independent. London. Archived from the original on September 3, 2017.
- Franks, Mary Anne (2014). "It's simple: criminalize revenge porn, or let men punish women they don't like". The Guardian. Archived from the original on April 17, 2017.
- Franks, Mary Anne (2014). "The Many Ways Twitter Is Bad at Responding to Abuse". The Atlantic. Archived from the original on February 5, 2017.
- Franks, Mary Anne (August 13, 2014). "Presumed Unworthy". The Huffington Post. Archived from the original on July 6, 2015.
- Franks, Mary Anne (April 1, 2015). "The ACLU's Frat House Take on 'Revenge Porn'". The Huffington Post. Archived from the original on June 30, 2015.
- Franks, Mary Anne (June 22, 2015). "How to Defeat 'Revenge Porn': First, Recognize It's About Privacy, Not Revenge". The Huffington Post. Archived from the original on June 25, 2015.
- Franks, Mary Anne (June 26, 2015). "Who's Afraid of Hot Girls?". The Huffington Post. Archived from the original on June 30, 2015.
- Franks, Mary Anne (November 30, 2001). "The Need for Sexual Privacy Laws". Brookings Tech Tank. Brookings Institution. Archived from the original on July 3, 2015.
- Franks, Mary Anne (January 23, 2014). "Free Speech Elitism: Harassment is not the Price "We" Pay for Free Speech". The Huffington Post Blog. Archived from the original on July 8, 2015.
- Franks, Mary Anne (September 3, 2014). "Precautions and Privacy". nydailynews.com. New York Daily News. Archived from the original on July 9, 2015.
- Franks, Mary Anne (March 3, 2014). "Stand Your Ground's Woman Problem". The Huffington Post Blog. Archived from the original on July 8, 2015.
- Franks, Mary Anne (October 9, 2014). "Jennifer Lawrence is Right: Why Nonconsensual Porn Should be a Sex Crime". The Daily Dot. Archived from the original on July 8, 2015.
- Franks, Mary Anne (2015). "Protecting Sexual Privacy: New York Needs a 'Revenge Porn' Law" (PDF). Atticus. 27 (1). Archived (PDF) from the original on December 12, 2019.
- Franks, Mary Anne (September 3, 2014). "The Internet's Privacy Hypocrisy". The Daily Dot. Archived from the original on July 3, 2015.

Academic Scholarship

- Franks, Mary Anne (2012). "Unwilling Avatars: Idealism and Discrimination in Cyberspace". Columbia Journal of Gender and Law. 20 (2): 224–261. SSRN 1374533.
- Franks, Mary Anne (2012). "Sexual Harassment 2.0". Maryland Law Review. 7 (3): 655–704. Archived from the original on October 2, 2022.
- Citron, Danielle Keats; Franks, Mary Anne (2014). "Criminalizing Revenge Porn". Wake Forest Law Review. 49 (2): 345–392. Archived from the original on May 25, 2022.
- Franks, Mary Anne (February 2014). "How to Feel Like a Woman, or Why Punishment Is a Drag" (PDF). UCLA Law Review. 61 (3): 566–605. Archived (PDF) from the original on April 5, 2015.
- Franks, Mary Anne (August 2014). "I Am/I Am Not: On Angela Harris's Race and Essentialism in Feminist Legal Theory". California Law Review. 102 (4): 1053–1068. SSRN 2477961.
- Franks, Mary Anne (September 18, 2014). "Real Men Advance, Real Women Retreat: Stand Your Ground, Battered Women's Syndrome, and Violence as Male Privilege". University of Miami Law Review. 68 (4). SSRN 2498180.
- Franks, Mary Anne (January 18, 2012). "When Bad Speech Does Good". Loyola University Chicago Law Journal. 43. SSRN 1987855.
- Franks, Mary Anne (December 2011). "Lies, Damned Lies, and Judicial Empathy". Washburn Law Journal. 51 (1). SSRN 2019755.
- Franks, Mary Anne (2007). "Guantanamo Forever: United States Sovereignty and the Unending State of Exception". Harvard Law and Policy Review. 1. SSRN 1369355.
- Franks, Mary Anne (August 17, 2015). "Drafting an Effective 'Revenge Porn' Law: A Guide for Legislators". SSRN. SSRN 2468823.
- Franks, Mary Anne (March 14, 2016). "Men, Women, and Optimal Violence". University of Illinois Law Review. SSRN. SSRN 2817389. Archived from the original on October 2, 2022.
