= Asia Eaton =

American feminist social psychologist and professor

Asia A. Eaton
- Education: Carnegie Mellon University (BS, BA); University of Chicago (MA, PhD); Florida International University (MS)
- Known for: Research on image-based sexual abuse and technology-facilitated sexual violence
- Scientific career
- Fields: Psychology
- Institutions: Florida International University

Asia Eaton (or Asia A. Eaton) is an American feminist social psychologist and professor at Florida International University (FIU). She is known for her research on gender, power dynamics in relationships and workplaces, and technology-facilitated sexual violence, particularly image-based sexual abuse (historically referred to as nonconsensual pornography). Since 2016, she has served as head of research for the Cyber Civil Rights Initiative (CCRI), a nonprofit organization focused on combating image-based sexual abuse.

== Early life and education ==
Eaton earned a Bachelor of Science in psychology and a Bachelor of Arts in philosophy from Carnegie Mellon University. She received a Master of Arts and Ph.D. in psychology, with a minor in statistics, from the University of Chicago. She also holds a Master of Science in clinical mental health counseling from Florida International University.

== Career ==
Eaton began her academic career following the completion of her doctoral studies in psychology at the University of Chicago. She later joined Florida International University, where she became a professor of psychology and founded the Power, Women, and Relationships (PWR) Lab, which examines gender, power, and identity in interpersonal relationships and workplaces. She has been involved in the development of FIU's Applied Social and Cultural Psychology Ph.D. program and has been affiliated with the Industrial-Organizational Psychology track.

Since 2016, Eaton has served as head of research at the Cyber Civil Rights Initiative, where she has led national surveys and research initiatives on image-based sexual abuse and online abuse. Her research and expertise have been cited in media coverage addressing online harassment, image-based sexual abuse, and digital exploitation, including reporting on sextortion and online abuse trends.

As of 2025–2026, she is on leave from Florida International University and serves as executive director of Mindbridge.

== Research ==
Eaton's research focuses on gender inequality, discrimination, intimate partner violence, and technology-facilitated abuse, with particular emphasis on image-based sexual abuse and online exploitation.

=== Image-based sexual abuse ===
Eaton has studied image-based sexual abuse as a form of sexual violence and has advocated for updated terminology that replaces outdated terms such as "revenge porn". In 2017, she co-led a nationwide study of over 3,000 U.S. adults examining victimization and perpetration of image-based sexual abuse. The study found that approximately one in twelve respondents reported lifetime victimization. Her research has also examined how image-based sexual abuse may function as a form of intimate partner violence and highlighted limitations in legal protections.

=== Sextortion and online abuse ===
Eaton's research has also addressed sextortion and technology-facilitated abuse, including increases during the COVID-19 pandemic. Reports citing related research have documented patterns of online exploitation and threats. Her work has also contributed to discussions of emerging forms of abuse such as sexually explicit deepfakes and gaps in legal protections.

== Selected publications ==
- 2017 Nationwide Online Study of Nonconsensual Porn Victimization and Perpetration (Report). Cyber Civil Rights Initiative. 2017.
- Ruvalcaba, Yanet; Eaton, Asia A. (2020). "Nonconsensual pornography among U.S. adults". Psychology of Violence.
- Eaton, Asia A. (2021). "Nonconsensual porn as a form of intimate partner violence". Trauma, Violence, & Abuse.
- Eaton, Asia A.; McGlynn, Clare (2020). "The psychology of nonconsensual porn". Policy Insights from the Behavioral and Brain Sciences.
- Eaton, Asia A. (2022). "Technology-facilitated sexual violence and mental health outcomes". Journal of Interpersonal Violence.
- Eaton, Asia A. (2025). "Online abuse and digital exploitation trends". Computers in Human Behavior.
- Eaton, Asia A. (2023). Navigating Your Ph.D. American Psychological Association.
- "Spotlight: Asia Eaton". American Psychological Association.

== Recognition ==
Eaton is a Fellow of the American Psychological Association.

=== Awards ===
- Recipient of the Citizen Psychologist Award, recognizing contributions to applying psychological science for public benefit.
