= Charlotte Laws =

American community activist

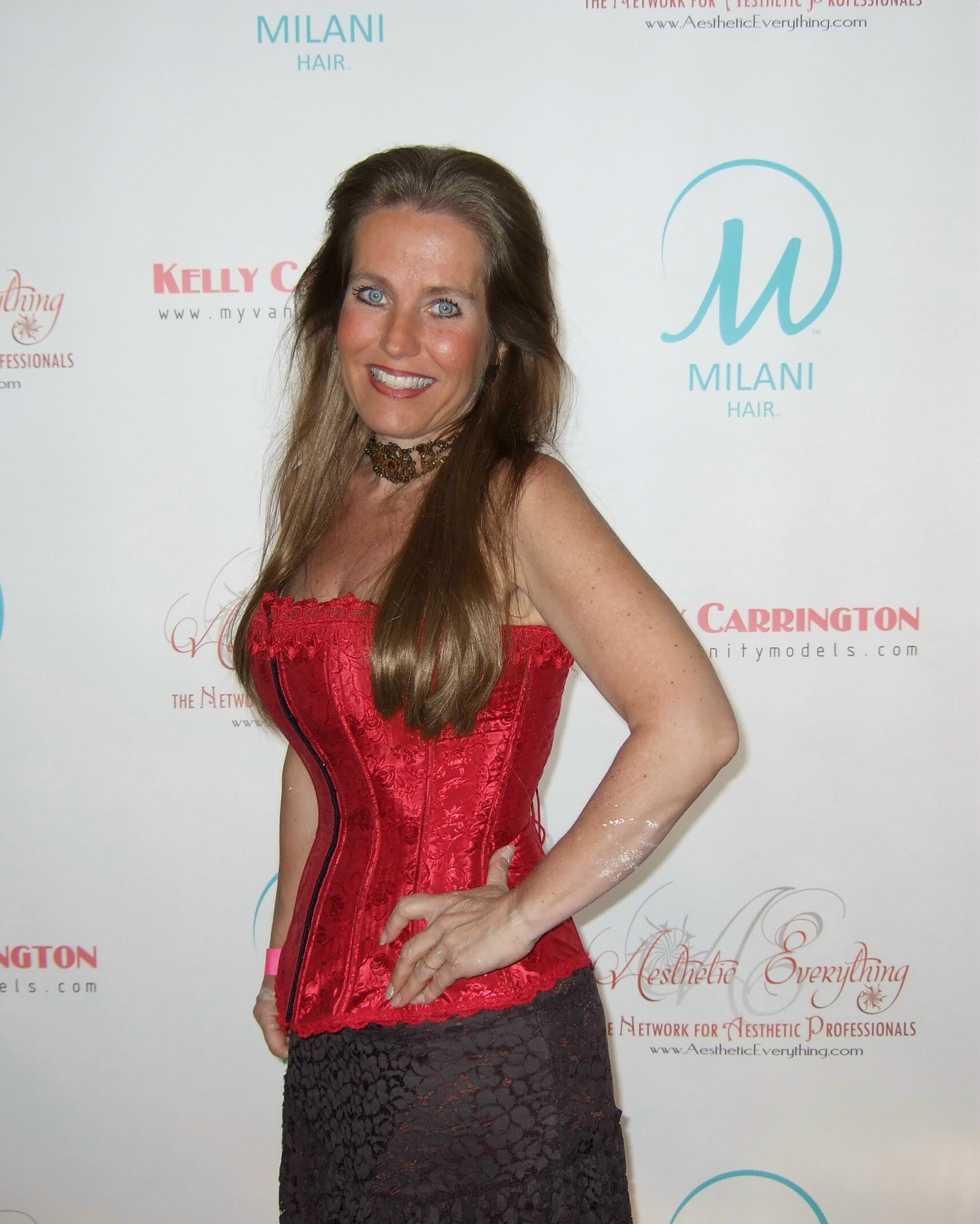
- Laws in June 2010

Member of the Greater Valley Glen Council
- In office 2004–2012
- Succeeded by: Rachel Friedman

Personal details
- Born: Charlotte Anne Laws; May 11, 1960 (age 66) Atlanta, Georgia, U.S.
- Party: Independent
- Spouse: Charles Parselle
- Children: 1
- Website: charlottelaws.com

Charlotte Anne Laws (born May 11, 1960), also known by her stage name Missy Laws, is an American author, talk show host, animal rights advocate, anti-revenge porn activist, former politician, and actress. Laws is a former BBC News contributor and was a weekly commentator on KNBC-TV's The Filter with Fred Roggin from 2009 to 2013. She also co-hosted the Internet show Every Way Woman (2008–2013) and hosted a local television show called Uncommon Sense from October 2007 to September 2010.

Laws is a former member of the Greater Valley Glen Council in the neighborhood of Valley Glen, Los Angeles, California. She was termed out of office in 2012, after serving four two-year terms. In May 2006, Laws was appointed by Los Angeles Mayor Antonio Villaraigosa to serve on the city's 912 Commission, also known as the Neighborhood Council Review Commission.

Laws is the founder and president of two organizations: the Directors of Animal Welfare (DAW) and the League for Earth and Animal Protection (LEAP). In 2006, Laws was the recipient of the Los Angeles Animal Humanitarian Award. Laws is a vegan and an advocate of the vegan diet.

== Biography ==
=== Acting and writing career ===
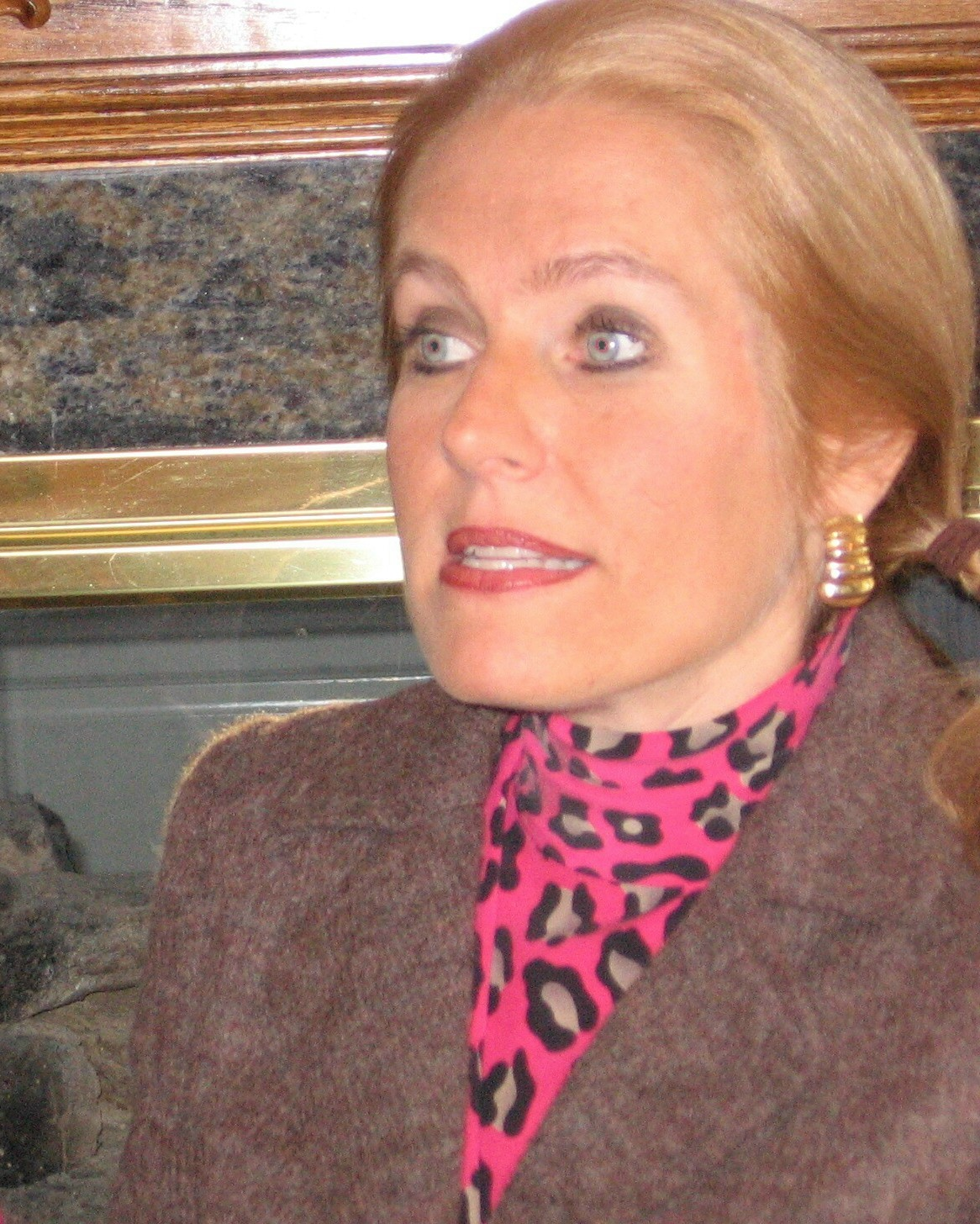
Laws during a television interview in June 2009.

Laws studied acting at the Academy Theatre of Atlanta, Joe Bernard's Acting Studio in Las Vegas and the Estelle Harman Actors Workshop in Los Angeles. She worked as a model and actress in movies and television until her late 20s. She has performed as a stand-up comic at The Comedy Store in Los Angeles.

In 1988, Laws authored the book Meet the Stars, which details how the average person can succeed in the entertainment industry. She promoted the book on Larry King Live, Oprah Winfrey, The Late Show.

From 1997 to 2000, Laws wrote for the British magazine Mad Dogs and Englishmen. Her articles on the news, current events, philosophy and social issues have been published in the Los Angeles Daily News, E the Environmental Magazine, Philosophy Now,The Huffington Post, Opinion Editorials, Los Angeles Times, Jezebel, Gawker, Newsweek, Salon, the New York Daily News, and The Washington Post.

On April 11, 2015, Laws' memoir titled Rebel in High Heels was released. The book details her fight against revenge porn and the first 22 years of her life. Her book Devil in the Basement was released on March 14, 2018. This nonfiction novel is about Laws' grandfather, who devil worshipper Ernie Yost murdered in 1948. The book also spotlights the rampant prejudice directed at Italian-Americans in the early twentieth century and delves into the real-life romance between Laws’ great aunt Rose and Vito Giacalone, a former Detroit mobster and the prime suspect in the death of labor union leader, Jimmy Hoffa.

On August 15, 2019, Laws's second memoir, Undercover Debutante: The Search for My Birth Parents and a Bald Husband, was published. The book won a Publishers Weekly book award and covers Laws' life from age 22 until 39. The book explains how the author tracked down her birth family and found a husband after a number of disastrous boyfriends. It also includes some of the author's celebrity escapades.

Laws plays Human #46 on the 2020 Netflix series 100 Humans and stars in the Netflix documentary The Most Hated Man on the Internet.

Laws's two newest books are 1) Elevator People: A Time Travel Novel. It had a release date of July 11, 2025. 2) Omniocracy: A Government that Represents All Living Beings. This nonfiction book was released on October 4, 2025 which coincided with World Animal Day.

=== Activism against revenge porn ===
In January 2012, after an unreleased topless photo of Laws' daughter, Kayla, was posted on the revenge porn website Is Anyone Up?, Laws began an investigation of Hunter Moore, who ran the site. She contacted the FBI who launched their own investigation of Moore and his website. Laws determined a large number of the photos on the site had been hacked. She contacted dozens of victims and became known as the "Erin Brockovich of revenge porn." Laws detailed her revenge porn battle in an article published on Jezebel. Her experiences were further detailed in her book, Rebel in High Heels, which was released in April 2015.

Moore removed his website in the midst of the FBI investigation, but announced on November 28, 2012, that he would start a new site that would include address information. This prompted Laws to make Moore's home address public on Twitter and Moore threatened to ruin her life. She soon received death threats, computer viruses, and a stalker appeared at her home. Internet hackers professing to be affiliated with Anonymous came to her aid, hacking into his servers and posting his personal information on the Internet. The FBI arrested Hunter Moore and his hacker, Charles Evens of Studio City, California, who went under the alias of "Gary Jones", on January 23, 2014. On February 18, 2015, it was announced that Moore would plead guilty to federal computer hacking and identity theft charges. He faced up to 7 years in prison and a $500,000 fine. He received two and a half years in federal prison. With no plea deal in place and facing 42 years in prison, Moore's hacker, Charlie Evens, confessed his crimes to CNN on tape at Laws' house during an interview that CNN was filming with Laws. The taped confession aired on April 27, 2015. Evens received 26 months in federal prison.

On June 4, 2013, Laws gave testimony before the California State Senate in favor of SB 255, a law designed to protect victims from revenge porn or "cyber rape," a term Laws coined. The bill was sponsored by State Senator Anthony Cannella of Modesto, California and was signed into law on October 1, 2013, making California the second state to pass a law designed to help victims of non-consensual pornography. Until 2018, Laws was a board member of the Cyber Civil Rights Initiative (CCRI), an organization dedicated to helping victims of online harassment. Since 2012, Laws has been meeting with state and federal legislators, urging them to pass laws to protect victims.

In 2017, Speier and several other legislators, introduced the Ending Non-consensual Online User Graphic Harassment (ENOUGH) Act., A federal bill called The SHIELD Act (Stopping Harmful Image Exploitation and Limiting Distribution) was later introduced in 2019. In 2022 the PROTECT Act was introduced. In addition to pushing for a federal anti-revenge porn law, Laws has worked on the problem of deep fake pornography and sextortion. She claims to have assisted over 800 victims of non-consensual pornography, morphed porn (or deep fakes), and sextortion since the inception of her activism in 2012.

Laws stars in the Netflix docuseries, The Most Hated Man on the Internet, produced by Raw TV. It began streaming on July 27, 2022.

Laws has discussed her battle against revenge porn on various television shows and podcasts including Tamron Hall, The Adam Carolla Show, Ask Dr. Drew, Good Day LA, Inside Edition, Access Hollywood, Banfield, Lorraine and News Desk with Tom Newton Dunn. Laws has made presentations on the issue at the Woodrow Wilson International Center for Scholars, the University of Wisconsin-Oshkosh and to lawyers affiliated with the office of the United States Attorney.

=== Political Advocacy for Animals ===
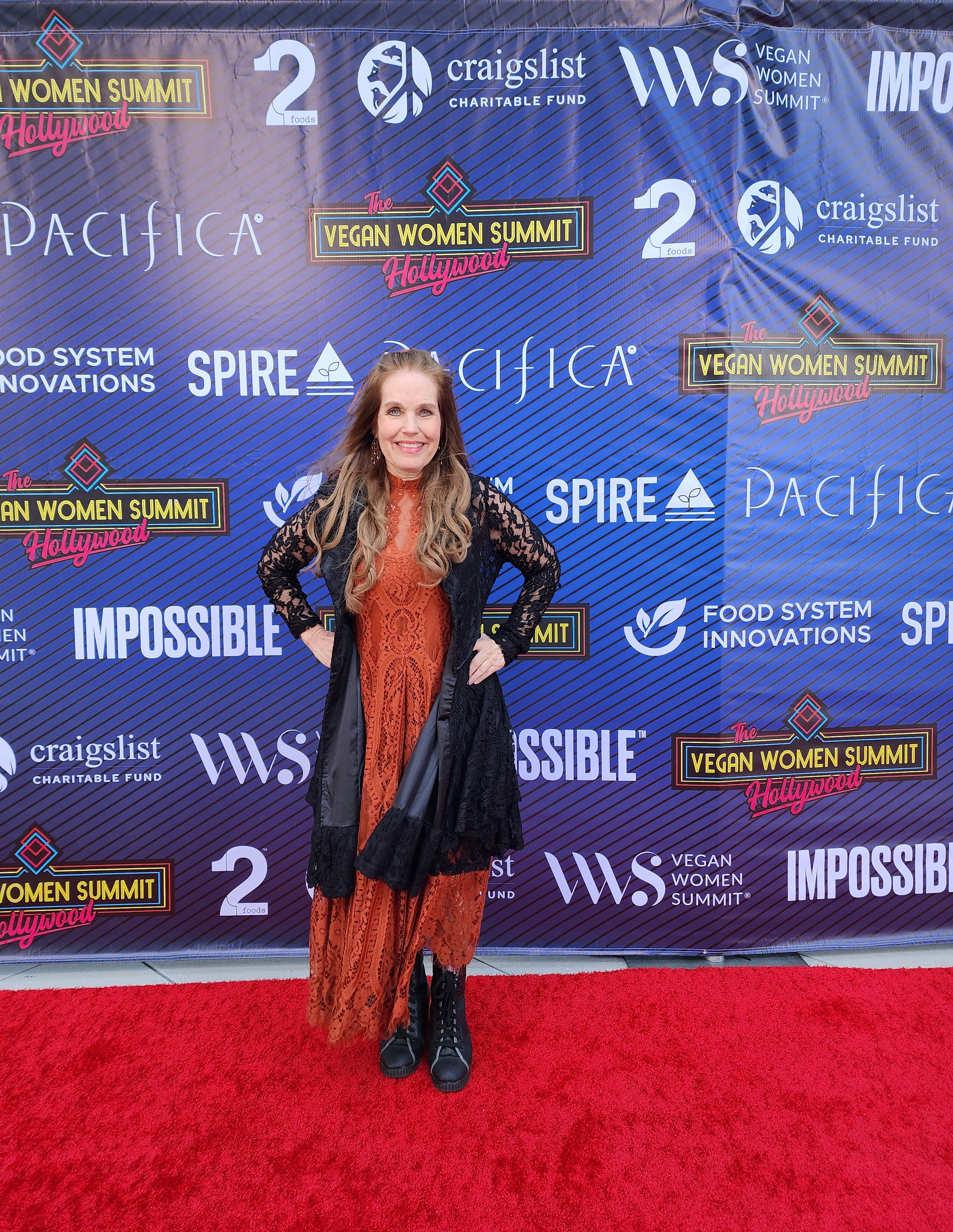
Charlotte Laws on the red carpet at the Vegan Women Summit 2024

Laws, a passionate advocate for animal rights, ventured into local politics to represent animals. In her 2004 campaign for a seat on the Greater Valley Glen Council, she pledged to represent both human and nonhuman constituents. After her election, a new role called the Director of Animal Welfare (DAW) was created based on her recommendation.

The city government later endorsed the DAW program, spreading to approximately fifty neighborhoods in Los Angeles. Most DAWs are appointed by neighborhood councils, but the program's bylaws also allow for DAW general membership to make appointments.

Laws describes the DAW program as an effort to increase the representation of animals in policy making. She elaborated, "The DAWS provide a voice and a form of political representation for nonhuman animals." This initiative is part of a broader international trend towards institutionalizing the political representation of animals and aims to expand the definition of the political community.

=== Political commentator ===
Charlotte Laws is a political analyst and has worked as a BBC News contributor since 2015. She has also made appearances on the Al Jazeera network, and participated in a Reddit AMA in September 2015 with Rick Wilson. Laws has publicly discussed "hidden Trump supporters" and called Trump a feminist and a pacifist. Some of her controversial articles about Trump and politics have appeared in HuffPost and The Daily Caller. In 2019, she stated she was supporting Cory Booker and Tulsi Gabbard for the 2020 presidential election.

=== Bill Cosby scandal ===
On November 30, 2014, Laws spoke out about her "34-year-old Bill Cosby secret." In a Salon.com article, she detailed her experiences with Cosby and a friend she calls "Sandy". Laws claims that "Sandy" was already in a long term sexual relationship with Cosby before he drugged "Sandy" in 1981 before they had sex. Laws was interviewed on Dr. Drew On Call in December 2014 about this issue, suggesting a few days later, in a Fox News interview, that Cosby has somnophilia.

=== Gay rights activism ===
In March 2015, Laws came to defend the LGBTQ communities when a Southern California attorney proposed a statewide ballot initiative that permitted the execution of gays by "bullets to the head or any other convenient method." The initiative was called the Sodomite Suppression Act. In response to what was seen as a vicious and repugnant attack on LGBTQ people, Laws registered a rebuttal initiative with the Attorney General's office, titled "The Intolerant Jackass Act." Laws’ proposal called for sensitivity training and a steep fine for anyone submitting a state initiative related to the killing of gays. In June 2015, the initiative was cleared to move forward, but Laws said that she did not plan to gather signatures, adding "I'm glad my proposal made an impact. My intent was to send a message and support gay rights. [The proposal] has served its purpose."

=== Personal life ===
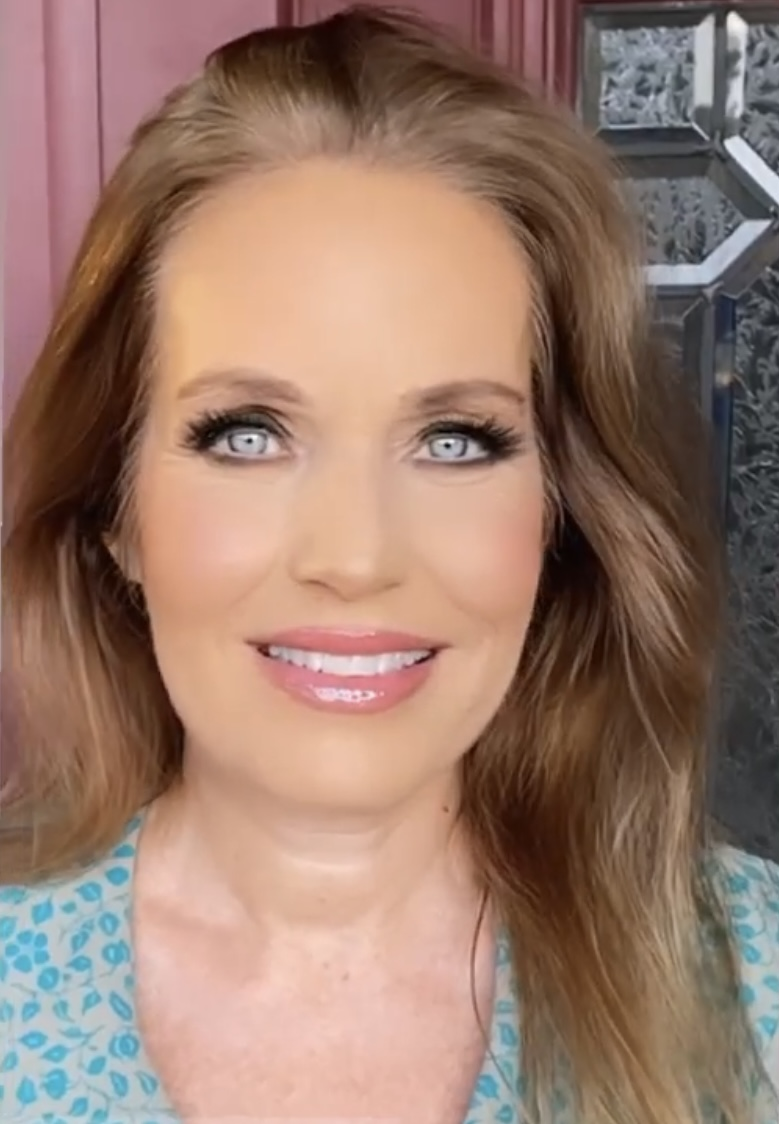
Charlotte Laws in 2022 just prior to taping the Bill Schulz Mornin' Show

Laws, a former Atlanta debutante, was adopted at birth. Her adoptive father was abusive, her adoptive mother committed suicide and her little brother died in a car accident. She tracked down her birthparents in her late twenties. She met her brother and sister for the first time in 2015. Laws has said that she has never had a glass of alcohol or tried illegal drugs or a cigarette.

After graduating from high school at The Lovett School in Atlanta, Georgia, Laws attended the University of Florida and the University of Nevada, Las Vegas. She moved to Los Angeles and completed two bachelor's degrees at California State University, Northridge (CSUN), one in theatre and the other in philosophy. She earned two master's degrees, one in professional writing and the other in social ethics, and a Ph.D. in social ethics from the University of Southern California. She completed post-doctoral coursework at Oxford University, England.

Prior to acting and writing, Laws was employed in a number of other jobs. She was a cab driver, private investigator, bodyguard, backup singer for an Elvis impersonator, nurse, fashion designer, aerobics instructor, antiques shop owner, and president of a legal corporation. Laws was a lecturer for the FBI in Quantico, Virginia in 2006 and has also been a licensed realtor since 1987.

In April 2015, Laws went public about her three-year romance with singer Tom Jones in her memoir, Rebel in High Heels. She says he was her first boyfriend and that she dated him from age 18 until age 21. She married English barrister and California attorney Charles Parselle in the 1990s and has a daughter named Kayla Laws, who is an actress. She calls herself a Jewish Jain. Laws’ father-in-law, Thomas Parselle, was captured by the Nazis during World War II, transported to a German POW camp and witness to the notorious break-out attempt as depicted in the movie, The Great Escape.

In 2012, Laws' chicken, Mae Poulet, was a write-in vice presidential candidate. A dog selected her from Tennessee to be his running mate on the Bully ticket. Mae Poulet was also involved in a 2011 fundraiser with actress Natalie Portman and actor Jason Alexander to raise money for poultry in need. In March 2013, Mae Poulet was inducted into the National Museum of Animals and Society.

Laws' grandfather, Tucker Moroose (a lawyer and aspiring U.S. Senator), was murdered by a devil worshipper in Fairmont, West Virginia in 1948. The story is detailed in Laws' book, Devil in the Basement.

In July 2019, Laws admitted in an article that she committed a crime which may have violated the Animal Enterprise Terrorism Act when she conspired to rescue pigeons.

== Selected publications ==
- Laws, Missy. Meet the Stars. Ross Books, 1988, ISBN 0-89496-002-4.
- Laws, Charlotte. "Jains, the ALF, and the ELF: Antagonists or Allies?" Igniting a Revolution: Voices in Defense of Mother Earth, edited by Steven Best and Anthony J. Nocella. AK Press, 2006. ISBN 1-904859-56-9.
- Laws, Charlotte. ARMed for Ideological Warfare.
- Laws, Charlotte. "The Jain Center of Southern California" A Call to Compassion: Religious Perspectives on Animal Advocacy, edited by Anthony J. Nocella and Lisa Kemmerer. Lantern Books, March 2011. ISBN 978-1-59056-182-9.
- Laws, Charlotte. "Omniocracy" Uncaged: Top Activists Share Their Wisdom on Effective Farm Animal Advocacy, edited by Ben Davidow. Davidow Press, March 2013. ASIN: B00C0NF36G.
- Laws, Charlotte. "Recipe for Cooperation: Omniocracy and the Definitional Good." Animals and the Environment: Advocacy, activism and the quest for common ground, edited by Lisa Kemmerer. Routledge, April 28, 2015. ISBN 978-1-138-82588-8.
- Laws, Charlotte. Rebel in High Heels: True story about the fearless mom who battled—and defeated—the kingpin of revenge porn and the dangerous forces of conformity. Stroud House Publishing, 2015, ISBN 0-99613-351-8.
- Laws, Charlotte. Devil in the Basement: White Supremacy, Satanic Ritual, and My Family Stroud House Publishing, 2018 ISBN 978-0-9961335-3-1
- Laws, Charlotte. Undercover Debutante: The Search for my Birth Parents and a Bald Husband Stroud House Publishing, August 2019. ISBN 978-0-9961335-6-2
- Laws, Charlotte Elevator People: A Time Travel Novel Stroud House Publishing, July 2025 ISBN 978-0-9961335-0-0
- Laws, Charlotte Omniocracy: A Government that Represents All Living Beings Stroud House Publishing, October 2025 ISBN 978-1-7333410-1-1

== See also ==
- List of animal rights advocates
- Party for the Animals
- Marianne Thieme
