= Is Anybody Down? =

Non-consensual pornography website

- Dissolved: April 4, 2013
- Owner: Craig Brittain
- Commercial: no
- Launched: December 1, 2011
- Current status: Defunct

Is Anybody Down? was a revenge porn website founded by Craig Brittain and Chance Trahan where users could anonymously upload nude photographs along with information identifying the person in the photograph (including full names, addresses, phone numbers, and Facebook screenshots). The site also contained a section of nude photographs titled "Anonymous Bounty", where users were offered "free stuff" if they could provide the Facebook or Twitter information of any of the people pictured. In concept, the website recapitulated the now-defunct Is Anyone Up?, which was shut down in April 2012, shortly before an FBI investigation into the propriety of the site.

== Investigation ==
The activities of the website and the operators were investigated by the United States Federal Trade Commission, who stated that when people contacted the website, the site did not respond to their requests to remove the information. The FTC stated in their administrative complaint that the site advertised content removal services under the name "Takedown Hammer" and "Takedown Lawyer" that could delete consumers' images and content from the site in exchange for a payment of $200 to $500. The complaint says the sites for these services were owned and operated by Craig Brittain. Marc Randazza, a prominent First Amendment lawyer, compiled evidence that the two sites were part of the same operation. He offered to take the case of anyone whose images were displayed on Is Anybody Down without permission.

Under a settlement announced in January 2015 by the Federal Trade Commission, Brittain agreed to delete all of the site's content and to not open a new or similar website. The FTC said that Brittain had posted explicit photos and information of over 1,000 people. After various news agencies reported on the FTC settlement, Brittain complained that photos of him were being used without his permission and sent a Digital Millennium Copyright Act (DMCA) take down to Google objecting to 23 articles remaining in their search rankings. He said that the links were examples of "unauthorised use of photos of me and other related information".

== Shutdown of website ==
On April 4, 2013, Brittain announced via Twitter that "As of today Is Anybody Down is over." Although Brittain's tweets were interpreted to mean that the site would be shut down entirely, Brittain transferred the content of the site to a new domain, ObamaNudes.com.

== Follow-up venture ==
In 2015, Brittain and Trahan sought funding for Dryvyng, a vehicle for hire company that would compete with Uber and Lyft. Their plans gained attention when their ownership and prior involvement in IsAnybodyDown? was made public.

From 2017 through at least 2019, Brittain had an ongoing attempt to run as a far right-wing candidate for United States Senator in the state of Arizona.

== See also ==
- Is Anyone Up?
