= Harassment, Harmful Communications and Related Offences Act 2020 =

The Harassment, Harmful Communications and Related Offences Act 2020, also known as Coco's law, is an act of the Oireachtas dealing with non-Consensual Distribution of Intimate Images and cyberbullying.

== History ==
The legislation was originally introduced by Brendan Howlin in 2017.

In 2020 Jackie Fox, Mary Sheehan and Aisling O'Neil and the March for Justice Ireland group presented a petition with 33,000 signatures to Brendan Howlin and James Lawless calling for the criminalisation of cyberbullying.

Jackie Fox spoke of her daughter Nicole 'Coco' Fox who was subjected to cyberbullying from age 17, which included threats. Nicole died by suicide in 2018 at the age of 21. Mary Sheehan spoke of her daughter Kayleigh Ryan who died by suicide in 2019 at the age of 14 after suffering cyberbullying. Aisling O'Neil spoke of her daughter Mia who was subjected to racist cyberbullying and who died by suicide in 2019 at the age of 19.

The bill would be reintroduced into the committee stage the following day.

== Legislation ==
=== New offences created ===
Two new offences were created:

1. The taking, distribution, publication or threat to distribute intimate images without consent, and with intent to cause harm to the victim - this carries a maximum penalty of an unlimited fine and/or seven years imprisonment.
2. The taking, distribution or publication of intimate images without consent without a requirement that the person intended to cause harm to the victim - this carries a maximum penalty of a fine of €5,000 fine and/or up to twelve months in prison.

It is irrelevant if a person consented to the taking of an image if they did not consent to it being later being distributed.

It is an aggravating factor for sentencing if the perpetrator was in an intimate relationship with the victim.

The bill came into effect in 2021.

== Impact ==
By September 2024 nearly 100 prosecutions had been taken under the act.
