= Intimate Privacy Protection Act =

2016 proposed U.S. Federal Law

The Intimate Privacy Protection Act (IPPA) is a proposed amendment to Title 18 of the United States Code that would make it a crime to distribute nonconsensual pornography. The bill would "provide that it is unlawful to knowingly distribute a private, visual depiction of a person’s intimate parts or of a person engaging in sexually explicit conduct, with reckless disregard for the person's lack of consent to the distribution." The bill was introduced by Representative Jackie Speier in 2016.

The proposed law explicitly would not forbid the use of such images in reports to law enforcement, the courts, corrections officers, intelligence services, nor in other cases of public interest (perhaps including responses to a public health problem). The definition of "sexually explicit" is inherited from existing laws, and "reckless" is to be interpreted by prosecutors. Interactive computer platform providers (such as Wikimedia or Facebook) are not considered violators of the law if users upload something that violates the law, unless the platform explicitly invites such content.

The explicit protection ("safe harbor") for platform providers ("intermediaries") may have been inserted in response to requests by Google which had opposed an earlier version of the bill but supports the June 2016 one. The amendment has support from tech entrepreneur Peter Thiel. The ACLU does not favor the draft law because it imposes on free speech.

== See also ==
- Revenge porn
