= Sodomite Suppression Act =

Failed anti-LGBT ballot measure in California

The Sodomite Suppression Act, also known as the "Shoot The Gays Initiative" or "Kill The Gays Initiative," was a 2015 California ballot initiative proposed by Matt McLaughlin, an Orange County lawyer, that outlines seven measures relating to same-sex people engaging in sodomy, including the death penalty for anyone who participates. McLaughlin's act calls for the killing of gays and lesbians by "bullets to the head" or "any other convenient method." This proposed initiative is subject to a court order barring it from being distributed for signatures after a Sacramento County judge granted California Attorney General Kamala Harris's request to declare the initiative facially unconstitutional and therefore ineligible to receive a ballot title or summary.

== Background ==
McLaughlin had a similar Biblical inspiration for an initiative in 2004 when he sponsored the "King James Bible as Textbook initiative", "which would amend the Constitution to allow teachers to use the Bible in literature classes."

McLaughlin's proposal was received by the CA Office of the Attorney General on February 26 along with the $200 filing fee.

State Attorney General Kamala Harris was compelled to provide an official title and summary before the initiative signature-collective effort can proceed. Harris cited public safety and constitutionality of the initiative, stating "This proposal not only threatens public safety, it is patently unconstitutional, utterly reprehensible and has no place in a civil society." She asked the Superior Court to relieve her of the obligation freeing the author to seek the signatures. Harris is widely seen as being supportive of LGBT people and wanted to not be a part of a process that "seeks to legalize discrimination and vigilantism" unless there was no alternative. Once authorized it needs 365,880 valid signatures to qualify for the 2016 presidential election ballot.

On June 23, 2015, a Sacramento County judge issued a ruling stating that the proposed initiative was not constitutional, and therefore Attorney General Harris is not required to provide an official title or summary. As a result, the initiative cannot be distributed for signatures, effectively killing its chances of being included on a statewide ballot.

== Reaction ==
The Atlantic states the initiative, "which refers to homosexuality as 'a monstrous evil' and an 'abominable crime against nature,' would ban communicating messages of tolerance to minors; bar gays and lesbians, or anyone who voices acceptance, from holding government jobs or public office; and authorize mass murder" of lesbians and gays. The Atlantic stated that although the initiative was unlikely to get the needed signatures, and would probably be thrown out after the 2016 elections even if it did pass, still represented a test case of permissiveness in California's ballot process that would allow a "genocidal proposition". Senator Mark Leno stated, "These are the very challenges of our First Amendment right to free speech."

California Attorney General Kamala Harris tried to block the initiative as it "threatens public safety, it is patently unconstitutional, utterly reprehensible, and has no place in a civil society."

The California Legislative LGBT Caucus filed a formal complaint to have McLaughlin disbarred. Another gay Senator, Ricardo Lara stated that the "caucus is concerned that McLaughlin has run afoul of the state bar's moral character requirement for practicing attorneys." The caucus letter states shock that anyone would call for the execution of LGBT people. The Bay Area Reporter stated, "state bar's rules of conduct, section 2-400, stipulates that licensed practitioners are prohibited from discriminating based on sexual orientation, among other protected classes." A Change.org petition, "Disbar lawyer who wants to legalize the murder of LGBT people", has 101,722 supporters as of the end of March 2015.

== Related initiatives ==
In an effort to defend the LGBT community, Dr. Charlotte Laws drafted her own initiative called the "Intolerant Jackass Act" and submitted it to the Attorney General's office on March 23, 2015. It stated that "any person, herein known as an intolerant jackass, who brings forth a ballot measure that suggests the killing of gays and/or lesbians, shall be required to attend sensitivity training" and donate $5,000 to an LGBT cause. Laws said she had no intention of circulating her measure for signatures. It was created merely to mock McLaughlin and take his power away.

The "Shellfish Suppression Act" also takes its lead from the Biblical Old Testament book of Leviticus, but it cites Verse 11:12 "Whatesoever has fins nor scales in the waters, that shall be an abomination to you." The act would make selling or consuming shellfish a felony with a fine of $666,000 per occurrence, "and/or imprisonment up to 6 years, 6 months, and 6 days."

== Aftermath ==
In spite of its anti-gay text, many legal observers viewed the initiative as an attempt to criticize the initiative process. California has a long history of ballot initiatives that are challenging to implement, circulated by special interests, and/or are later found unconstitutional. The gay community itself had faced the Briggs Initiative, Proposition 22, and Proposition 8. The $200 filing fee had not been raised since the 1940s, and in the 1970s, the California Supreme Court adopted rules forcing the Attorney General to issue a summary to any initiative, even one he/she believed unenforceable, to avoid suppression of freedom of speech. The initiative lead to Assembly Bill 1100, raising the filing fee from $200 to $2000, and the legislature also consolidated initiatives on the November general election ballot.

== See also ==
- Faithful Word Baptist Church
- List of organizations designated by the Southern Poverty Law Center as anti-LGBT hate groups
