= James McGibney =

American entrepreneur

Dr. James McGibney
- Education: Boston University (BA, MA) Harvard Executive Education (Cybersecurity) Pepperdine University (Doctorate)
- Occupations: Entrepreneur, TV Host, Cybersecurity Expert
- Known for: CEO and founder of Bullyville Most Hated Man on the Internet (Netflix, 2023) Bully Hunter (A&E, 2025)
- Website: jamesmcgibney.com (personal) bullyville.com (company)

James McGibney is an American former Marine, cybersecurity expert, entrepreneur, and activist who is best known for the Netflix documentary, The Most Hated Man On The Internet, and appearances on the Dr. Phil Show. He is the CEO and founder of Austin, TX based Bullyville and the host of the new A&E show, Bully Hunter.

== Education ==
McGibney earned a doctorate in learning technologies from Pepperdine University's graduate school of education and psychology in May 2024 and had previously completed a master's degree in criminal justice from Boston University. After an eight week online course from Harvard University in 2021 he was awarded a cybersecurity Certificate about Managing Risk in the Information Age.

== Career ==
McGibney served in the United States Marine Corps, serving tours of duty with Third Surveillance Reconnaissance Intelligence Group and Marine Security Guard Battalion. He was awarded the Navy Achievement Medal for his service in the US Marines.

After leaving the Marine Corps, McGibney founded SecuraTrak, a satellite-based asset tracking system. McGibney was involved with the first deployment of Cisco UCS blade technology in 2009, while employed as data center lead at general contractor Tutor Perini.

In February 2011, McGibney announced the website Cheaterville.com, where anonymous users could post claims of infidelity, alongside names and pictures of those accused. He started websites based on similar user participation later in the year, as well as a matchmaking website.

In April 2012, McGibney acquired and shut down revenge porn website Is Anyone Up and redirected traffic to the newly launched Bullyville.com.

Since his July 2022 appearance in Netflix documentary, "The Most Hated Man on the Internet", McGibney has become a frequent guest on the Dr. Phil Show and "Phil in The Blanks" podcast as a cybersecurity expert.

On September 5, 2025, McGibney announced that he will be hosting Bully Hunter, a new A&E program in which he "uses his unique methods to unmask bullies, confront predators, and help victims reclaim their lives." Bully Hunter debuted on September 23, 2025.

=== IsAnyoneUp? controversy ===
In April 2012, McGibney purchased controversial revenge porn site Is Anyone Up? from Hunter Moore for US$12,000. Web traffic for the site was redirected to BullyVille.com. This effectively shut down the previous site, which was the stated intent of McGibney. Three days after the transaction, Moore used his Twitter account to accuse McGibney of being a pedophile and of possessing child pornography and threatened to rape McGibney's wife. As a result, McGibney sued Moore for defamation in Nevada's Clark County District Court in February 2013. The court entered a default judgment against Moore in the sum of $250,000 plus court costs and attorney fees. As of September 2021 the judgment had reached more than $338,000.

In April 2022, a short VICE documentary featuring McGibney detailing his involvement in the events which led up to the 2012 shutdown of revenge porn website Is Anyone Up? was published to YouTube. Moore did not participate.

On July 27, 2022, Netflix released a three-part documentary entitled "The Most Hated Man on the Internet" which featured McGibney describing how he acquired and shut down Is Anyone Up? as well as his interactions with Moore.

=== Texas SLAPP litigation ===
In December 2015, McGibney was ordered to pay a $1 million Anti-SLAPP court sanction and $300,000 in attorney's fees to Neal Rauhauser for filing a series of baseless lawsuits against him. The decision was believed to be the largest Anti-SLAPP sanction in United States History.

The ruling was temporarily reversed when the presiding judge granted McGibney's request for a new trial in February 2016 but reinstated in favor of Rauhauser on 14 April 2016 with the SLAPP sanction against McGibney reduced from $1 million to $150,000. The judge ruled that McGibney had filed the suits to willfully and maliciously injure Rauhauser and to deter him from exercising his constitutional right to criticize McGibney.

McGibney appealed and on April 19, 2018, a three judge panel in the Texas 2nd District Court of Appeals ruled in favor of McGibney, vacating the monetary and non-monetary sanctions findings, and reversing and remanding the amount of attorney's fees awarded in ruling that the trial court had abused its discretion. The appeals court further reversed the finding of "willfully and maliciously", noting that Rauhauser's attorney had engaged in a "troublesome pattern of heavy front-end loading of legal work" in his affidavit which attempted to justify the attorney's fees sought.

On September 28, 2018, the Supreme Court of Texas denied Rauhauser's request for review of 2nd District Court of Appeals' April 2018 decision. On November 20, 2018, the appellate mandate issued with an additional order that Rauhauser "shall pay all of the costs of this appeal." After years of inaction and delays, the hearing to determine attorney's fees ordered by the appellate court was set to occur on November 16, 2023, but neither Rauhauser nor his attorney were present at the scheduled time, so the trial court dismissed the case for "want of prosecution." In February 2024, Rauhauser appealed the dismissal and ultimately the trial court reinstated the case when his attorney demonstrated that he had had technical issues. The attorney's fee hearing was scheduled for November 19, 2024 for the third and final time. Rauhauser failed to appear despite an order by the trial judge to do so. The judge found "(b)ecause Defendant has failed to admit testimonial or documentary evidence regarding the reasonableness of the attorney's fees requested in this case, this Court is within its discretion to award an amount that it sees fit..." and awarded Rauhauser $2,500 contingent upon him paying McGibney the $2,303 in appellate fees Rauhauser still owed McGibney from 2018. This meant that what was once a judgment for $1 million in sanctions and $300,000 in legal fees effectively ended up being $197. Rauhauser appealed but failed to pay the required fees and on March 27, 2025, the appellate court dismissed the case, finally bringing to a close litigation that had stretched into its 11th year.
