= MyEx.com =

Revenge porn website

- Website type: Adult Website
- Available in: English
- Website: http://www.myex.com
- Registration: None
- Launched: 2013; 13 years ago
- Current status: Inactive

MyEx.com was a controversial, free revenge porn website focusing on hosting nude photographs of people posted by former lovers along with their real names.

== Concept ==
MyEx.com provided an opportunity for former lovers to upload pornographic photos of their ex-lovers acquired during the course of the relationship. Photos were generally posted with the full names of the person pictured nude and without that person's consent. Additionally, sexual comments about the subjects of the photos were solicited from visitors to the site. The site made its money through what has been described by opponents of the site as a form of blackmail—requiring subjects wishing to remove their photos pay a fee for doing so. As of January 9 of 2018, MyEx.com was shut down by the FTC.

== Controversy ==
Revenge porn in general is highly controversial and has been the subject of repeated attempts in different jurisdictions to criminalize it. A Missouri woman obtained a restraining order against her abuser, an ex-husband. The man then posted her nude photos on MyEx.com. She lobbied for a change in Missouri laws after she discovered there were no laws against posting sexually explicit nude photos, even with a restraining order in effect. A Seattle man was convicted and sentenced to one year in jail after posting topless and nude photos of his female clients on MyEx.com. He obtained the photos illegally through his work as a computer consultant. His specific crime appeared to be the stealing of the photos—as well as stalking the women—rather than the revenge porn per se. In addition, civil lawsuits have been filed in connection with specific alleged postings on MyEx.com. An ex-wife of former New York Giants player Jeff Roehl alleged that the former NFL star posted her nude photos on MyEx.com. Job loss has also resulted from postings on MyEx.com. MyEx.com, along with Google and Yahoo, has also been sued for copyright infringement based upon posted photos.

== Ownership ==
MyEx.com was owned by Shad Applegate (also known as Shad Cotelli), Aniello "Neil" Infante, and possibly others. The website operated through various shell companies, which were later discovered to be controlled by the same individuals. Primarily, it operated under the Nevada-based business EMP MEDIA INC., which stands for "Erotic Massage Parlor" This company also ran another now-defunct website, EroticMP.com.

Additional ownership ties include Websolutions Netherlands BV in 2013, which also operated the escort website Adult Search (adultsearch.com), a site still active today. Both MyEx.com and Adult Search were associated with International Spirit Limited, which shares trademark ownership with EMP MEDIA INC. International Spirit Limited also operates tsescorts.com, a site for transgender sex workers.

The ownership of MyEx.com remains complex. Ultimately, no clear owner was identified, as the operators were mysteriously released from their roles and are believed to have moved on to other websites of a similar nature.

== Taken Down ==
MyEx.com was taken down in mid January 2018 after complaints were filed by the US Federal Trade Commission and the State of Nevada.
