= Is Anyone Up? =

Defunct pornographic website

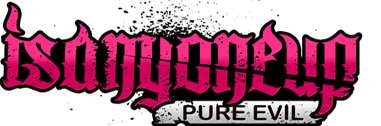

- Website type: Adult website, media submission
- Available in: English
- Owner: BullyVille
- Creator: Hunter Moore
- Registration: None
- Launched: 2010; 16 years ago
- Current status: Defunct; closed on April 19, 2012

Is Anyone Up? was a pornographic website based on stolen and hacked photos that ceased operation in 2012. It allowed users to submit photographs or videos anonymously, mainly nude, erotic, and sexually explicit images. The site was closely associated with the metalcore and post-hardcore music scene, also featuring and depicting numerous nude photos of musicians of these genres.

Is Anyone Up? was subject to great controversy because of the prevalence of revenge porn submissions to the service, many of which were submitted by former romantic partners without consent and with malicious intent. (Note: According to Charlotte Laws, about 36% of unedited photographs had been obtained from exes, although some of the women gave reasons to believe the ex had been hacked.)

Many of the submitted revenge porn images were obtained as a result of multiple email account hacks. The ongoing incidents resulted in numerous lawsuits and even death threats aimed at Hunter Moore, founder and owner of Is Anyone Up?. The website was shut down on April 19, 2012.

== History and background ==
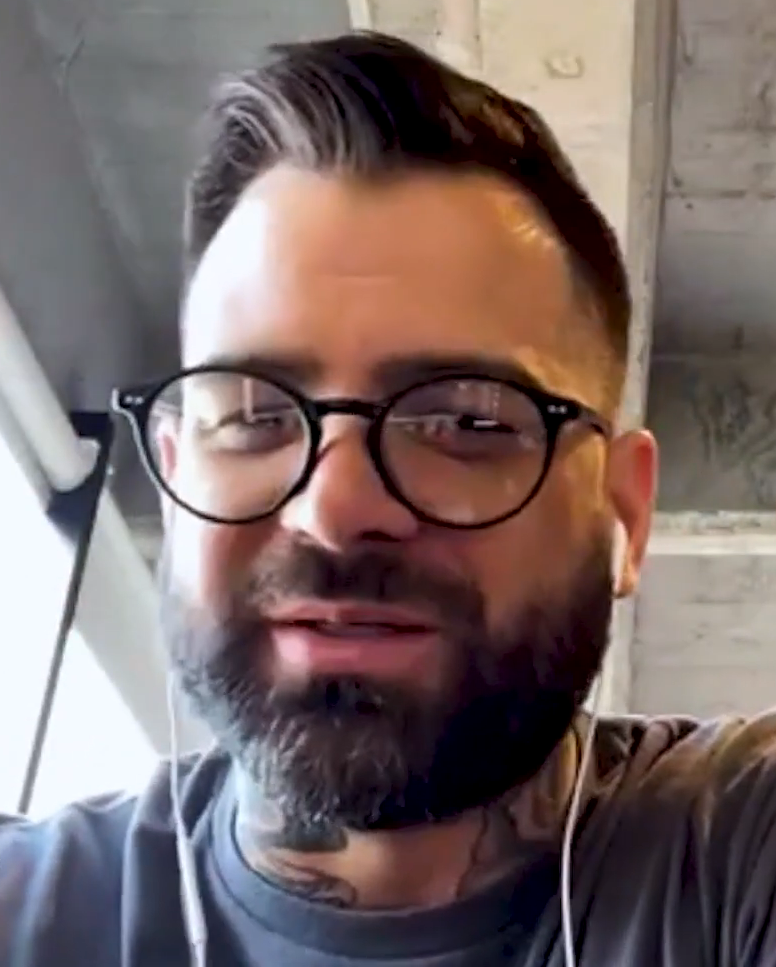
Hunter Moore in 2022

Is Anyone Up? was founded in late 2010. Founder Hunter Moore stated that the site was originally intended to be a nightlife website. The idea for the site came from a woman who he continually asked to send him suggestive pictures. He then created a blog, hosting nude photographs from any person who would send them to him, which eventually became isanyoneup.com. Moore profited off the website by running pornography ads and selling merchandise. For the month of November 2011, the website's revenue was $13,000, its server fees were $8,000, and its page views were over 30 million. Moore reported that he worked 19 hours a day, five days a week, managing the site, and had a team of six working for him, including two age-verification specialists, to ensure that everyone shown was at least 18 years old.

Submissions to the website usually followed the same formula, depicting a person's social networking website profile thumbnail (such as their Facebook or Twitter profile), then showing images of them clothed, before revealing images of their genitalia. In some cases, images showed people engaging in sexual acts such as masturbation. Each submission line then ended with a "reaction image", usually showing a still or animated gif file of a popular scene or Internet meme as a satirical "reaction" to the images shown.

Moore stated that he took legal precautions before uploading images to the site, initially verifying the age of the people whose photographs were submitted through social networking sites. He sent the IP information of people who submitted photos of underage individuals to a lawyer in Las Vegas, who turned it over to law enforcement. Another category on the site, called "Daily Hate", featured angry reactions from people who had their pictures posted without their consent.

On April 19, 2012, Moore sold the website to James McGibney, who runs Bullyville.com, a site which allows anonymous people to share details about people who have bullied or harassed them. Moore posted an open letter to BullyVille.com and on the isanyoneup.com domain explaining his decision.

== Controversy ==
Is Anyone Up? was the subject of much controversy. Many individuals sued Moore or those associated with the Is Anyone Up? domain for the display of their nude images on the website. While some images were self-submitted, others were "revenge porn", which has been described as being "pornographic souvenirs from relationships gone sour".

People threaten me with lawsuits every day, which is funny, because it fuels the site. ... The people that get mad hate my site and want to take it down. They send me all this crazy stuff, but at the same time they’re just building content for my site, which just makes me more popular.

In November 2011, Moore appeared on Anderson to discuss Is Anyone Up? while being confronted by two women who had been exposed on the website by an anonymous user. When one of the women criticized Moore for "helping" deceptive people who spread such photographs, he responded: "No one put a gun to your head and made you take these pictures. It's 2011, everything's on the Internet."

On August 21, 2012, BullyVille founder James McGibney posted an open letter to Hunter Moore on the main page of the isanyoneup domain, announcing a class action lawsuit and encouraging people to join in.

=== Incidents ===
Florida rock band A Day to Remember refused to play at the 2011 Bamboozle festival, knowing Hunter Moore was in attendance. They demanded that he be removed from the venue because they objected to Moore's site hosting nude images of the band's bassist, Joshua Woodard, weeks beforehand.

One morning in August 2011, Moore was attacked and stabbed with a pen by a woman featured on the website. Moore managed to escape with a shoulder wound that required surgery.

In December 2011, social networking website Facebook reportedly threatened legal action against the website, blocked any linking to the isanyoneup.com domain through its site, and deleted the official "like" page from its database.

=== FBI investigation ===
On May 16, 2012, The Village Voice reported that Moore and Is Anyone Up? were the subject of an investigation by the FBI, as a large number of the pictures formerly hosted on the site were believed to have been illegally obtained by a hacker known as "Gary Jones". ABC Nightline revealed that the FBI investigation was started by Charlotte Laws after a photo of her daughter appeared on the website.

In January 2014, Moore and his alleged aide Charles Evens were arrested by the FBI and indicted in a federal district court in California on charges of conspiracy, unauthorized access to a protected computer, and aggravated identity theft.

In February 2015, Moore pled guilty to aggravated identity theft and aiding and abetting in the unauthorized access of a computer.

On July 2, 2015, Charles Evens pleaded guilty to charges of computer hacking and identity theft, confessing to stealing hundreds of images from women's email accounts and selling them to Moore. U.S. District Judge Dolly M. Gee sentenced Evens to more than two years in jail and a fine of $2000. The same judge sentenced Moore in December 2015 to 2 1/2 years in a federal prison with three years' supervision following his release. He also had to undergo a mental health evaluation and pay a $2000 fine.

== In popular culture ==
Florida based metalcore group A Day to Remember have a song named "Life Lessons Learned The Hard Way" that describes an attack on Moore that was planned, but never carried out. The song also touches on the topic of a suicide that happened due to nude photos of the person being posted on the site and subsequently spread throughout the internet.

German metalcore group Electric Callboy have a single named "Is Anyone Up?" that describes the site's general idea and attributes. Electropop group Millionaires released a remix of the Ludacris song "My Chick Bad" titled "My Chick Bad (Remix)" that contained lyrics discussing posting images on Is Anyone Up?.

In July 2022, Netflix announced they were releasing a three-part documentary series on July 27 about Moore and IsAnyoneUp.com entitled The Most Hated Man on the Internet featuring interviews with victims and law enforcement. Moore initially agreed to take part in the documentary but later declined.

== See also ==
- Is Anybody Down?
- Motherless.com
