= Hunter Moore =

American revenge porn hacker (born 1986)

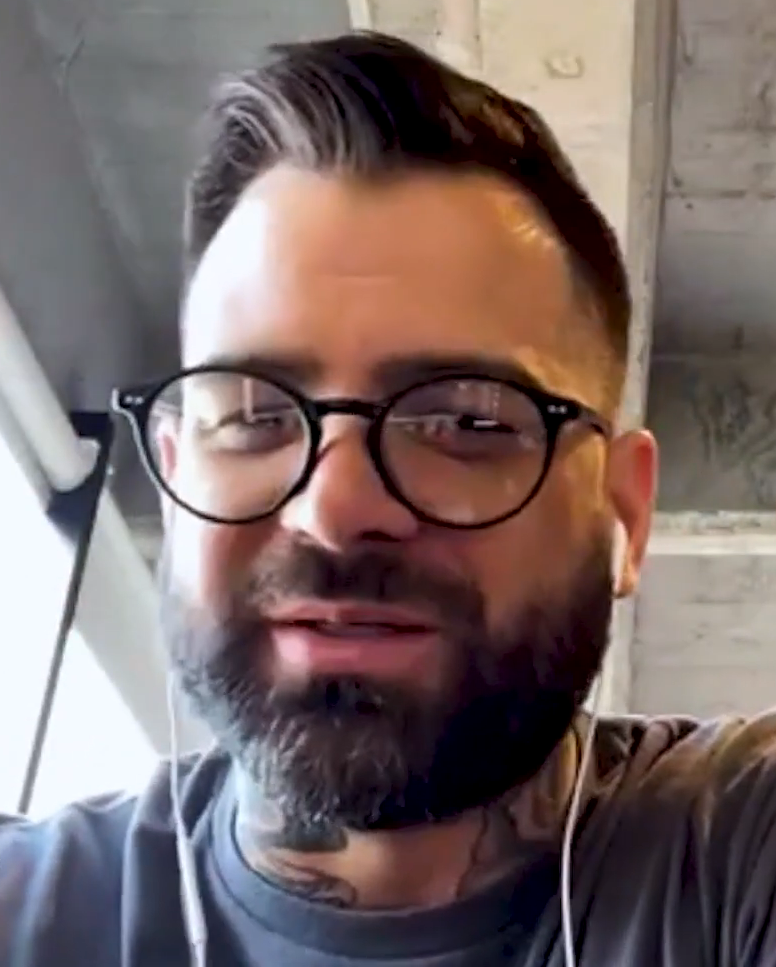
- Moore in 2022
- Born: March 9, 1986 (age 40); Sacramento, California, U.S.
- Known for: Is Anyone Up?

Hunter Edward Moore (born March 9, 1986) is an American convicted criminal from Sacramento, California. Rolling Stone called him "the most hated man on the Internet." In 2010, he created the revenge porn website Is Anyone Up? which allowed users to post sexually explicit photos of people online without their consent, often accompanied by personal information such as their names and addresses. He refused to take down pictures on request. Moore called himself "a professional life ruiner" and compared himself to Charles Manson. The website was up for 16 months, during which Moore stated several times he was protected by the same laws that protect Facebook. Moore also paid a hacker to break into email accounts of victims and steal private photos to post.

The FBI started an investigation on Moore in 2012 after receiving evidence from Charlotte Laws, the mother of one of the victims. The site was closed in April 2012 and sold to an anti-bullying group. In February 2015, Moore pleaded guilty to felony charges for aggravated identity theft and aiding and abetting in the unauthorized access of a computer. In November 2015, Moore was sentenced to two years and six months in prison, a $2,000 fine, and $145.70 in restitution. He was released from prison in May 2017.

In 2022, Netflix released The Most Hated Man on the Internet, a docuseries about Moore. Although Moore initially agreed to take part in the series, he then declined. The series reached No. 3 on the Netflix top 10.

== Early life and education ==
Moore was born in March 1986 and he grew up in Woodland, California. He attended and was expelled from Woodland Christian School.

== Is Anyone Up? ==
Moore started the website Is Anyone Up? in 2010. Moore stated that the site was originally intended to be a nightlife website, but after he and some friends received sexually explicit pictures from women they were involved with at the time, the site was changed, featuring revealing photos and videos of people who were not professional models, linked to their social networking profiles on Facebook or Twitter. Many of the subjects were outraged by inclusion on the site; in many cases the photos had been stolen from their hacked personal computers or shared without consent by former boyfriends or girlfriends as a form of revenge. Because of this, the site's content became known as "revenge porn". Moore reportedly responded to multiple cease-and-desist letters with simply "LOL" and would regularly argue that the law protected his activities.

Moore claimed that the website attracted 30 million page views monthly as well as yielding $8,000 to $13,000 a month in ad revenue. In response to public bragging by Moore about the website, BBC News named Moore "the Net's most hated man" and Rolling Stone called him "the most hated man on the Internet". Due to the site, Moore was banned from Facebook.

Moore eventually faced numerous lawsuits and an FBI investigation. He was also stabbed in the shoulder with a pen by a woman who had been featured on the site. Moore lived with his grandmother for a period of time while he feared he would be murdered in his sleep due to constant death threats.

On April 19, 2012, Moore sold the website to an anti-bullying group run by former U.S. Marine James McGibney for $12,000. After it was sold all the pornographic material was removed, and the URL was redirected to Bullyville.com. According to McGibney, he convinced Moore to sell him the website by claiming that users were uploading child pornography and that Moore might be prosecuted for this if he remained in control of the site; Moore himself claimed that he no longer wanted to deal with the stress of maintaining Is Anyone Up? and was struggling to pay the server bills.

== FBI investigation ==
Charlotte Laws, the mother of one of the victims on the site, decided to track Moore down and conducted a two-year investigation where she compiled evidence from more than 40 victims and gave it to the FBI.

In 2012, Moore and a hacker named Charles Evens (who went under the alias of "Gary Jones") were suspected of hacking-related crimes. The Wire stated that "on multiple occasions, [Moore] paid Evens to break into the email accounts of victims and steal nude photos to post on the website isanyoneup.com." When it became apparent to Moore that news about his FBI investigation was beginning to surface to the public, Moore responded with "I will literally fucking buy a first-class fucking plane ticket right now, eat an amazing meal, buy a gun in New York, and fucking kill whoever [talked about my FBI investigation]. I'm that pissed over it. I'm actually mad right now."

Moore also threatened to burn down The Village Voice headquarters if they ran a story about his FBI investigation. They ran the story regardless.

== Indictment ==
On January 23, 2014, Moore was indicted in a federal court in California following his arrest by the FBI on charges of conspiracy, unauthorized access to a protected computer, and aggravated identity theft. Many of these crimes were committed in an effort to obtain nude images of people against their will.

Moore was released two days later from Sacramento County Jail on a $100,000 bond. He was allowed no access to the Internet, and was required by law to dismantle the archives he owned for the Is Anyone Up? database, while the FBI monitored him doing so.

On January 24, 2015, exactly one year after Moore had last tweeted, tweets began to appear on his account making it seem like he had returned to the Internet. Moore's mother stated that his account was either taken over or hacked, and he had nothing to do with the tweets.

=== Guilty plea ===
On February 18, 2015, Moore entered a guilty plea with the Central District of California U.S. Attorney's Office, in which he admitted to aggravated identity theft and aiding and abetting in the unauthorized access of a computer. In addition to his mandatory prison sentence, Moore also agreed to a three-year period of supervised probation, a $2,000 fine and $145.70 in restitution. He also received an order that he delete all the data on his seized computers. Under the plea, he would serve a minimum of two years in prison, and a maximum of seven years and a $500,000 fine.

On July 2, 2015, accomplice Charles Evens pleaded guilty to charges of computer hacking and identity theft, confessing to stealing hundreds of images from women's email accounts and selling them to Moore. He also faced up to seven years imprisonment.

=== Conviction and sentencing ===
On November 16, 2015, Evens was sentenced to 2 years and 1 month imprisonment, as well as a $2,000 fine and $147.50 in restitution.

On December 2, 2015, Moore was sentenced to 2 1/2 years in federal prison, followed by three years of supervised release. He was also ordered to undergo a mental health evaluation while imprisoned.

Moore was released from prison on September 22, 2017.

== Defamation judgment ==
On March 8, 2013, Bullyville founder James McGibney won a $350,000 defamation judgment against Moore, after Moore called McGibney a "pedophile".

== Netflix documentary ==
Moore and his website are the subject of a three-part Netflix documentary, The Most Hated Man on the Internet. The end credits state that Moore initially agreed to feature in the documentary in person, but later declined to do so, ending with "we decided to use his image anyway".
