= Cyber Civil Rights Initiative =

Non-profit organization

The Cyber Civil Rights Initiative (CCRI) is a non-profit organization. Founded in 2012 by Holly Jacobs, the organization has compiled resources for victims of cybercrimes.

== Leadership ==
Holly Jacobs is the founder and a board member. Previously, she served as CCRI's President and Executive Director.

Mary Anne Franks is CCRI's President, Legislative and Tech Policy Director. Franks drafted the first model criminal statute on nonconsensual pornography, which has been used as a template for pending federal legislation.

Danielle Citron is CCRI's Vice President and Secretary. Citron and Franks have co-authored a piece titled Criminalizing Revenge Porn in the Wake Forest Law Review, which was the first law review article to take on the topic and its challenges.
