= Revenge porn =

Non-consensual distribution of sexually explicit material

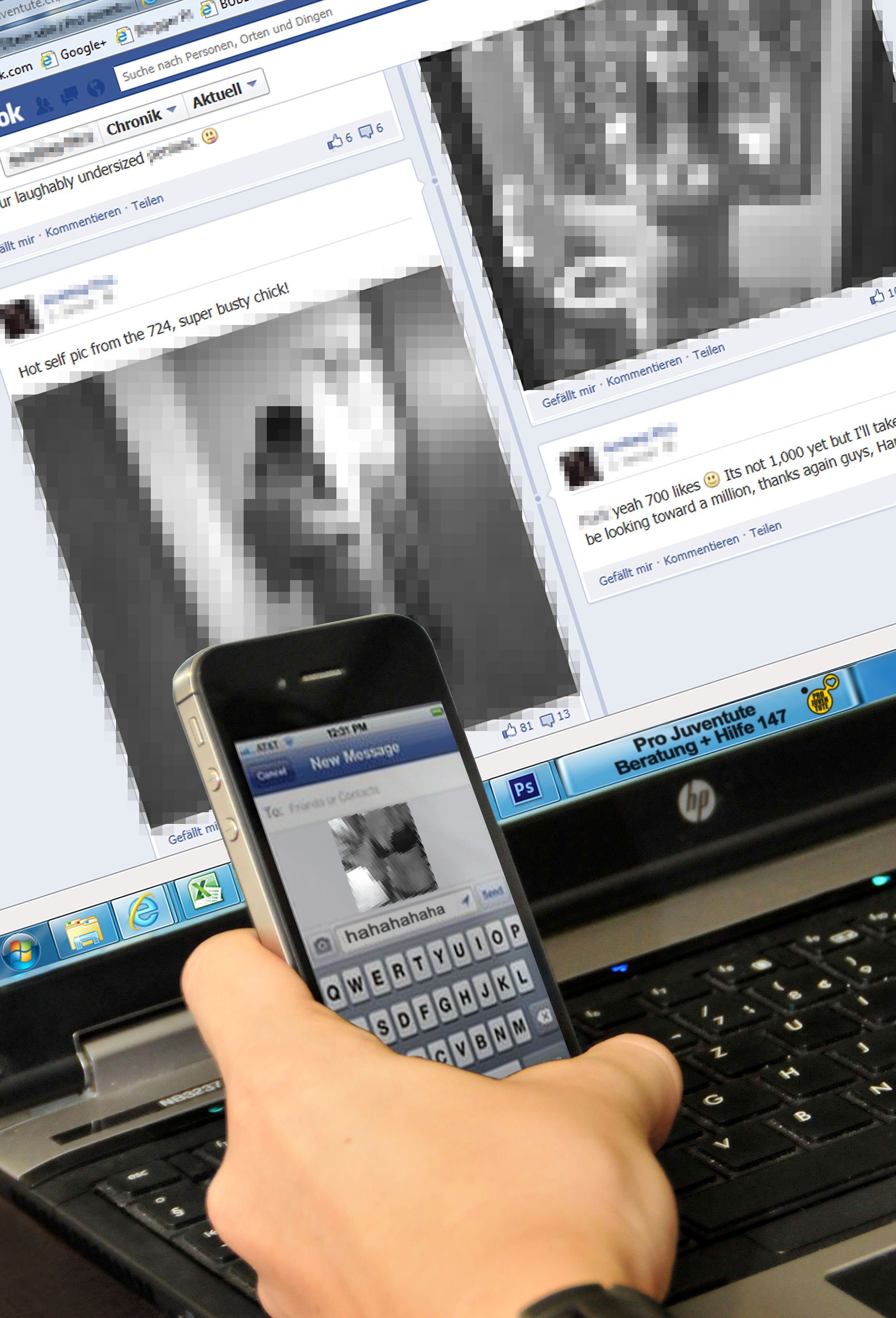
Simulated example of revenge porn from an awareness campaign by Pro Juventute

Revenge porn is the distribution of sexually explicit images or videos of individuals without their consent, with the punitive intention to create public humiliation or character assassination out of revenge against the victim. The material may have been made by an ex-partner from an intimate relationship with the knowledge and consent of the subject at the time, or it may have been made without their knowledge. The subject may have experienced sexual violence during the recording of the material, in some cases facilitated by psychoactive chemicals such as date rape drugs which also cause a reduced sense of pain and involvement in the sexual act, dissociative effects and amnesia and such.

The possession of the material may be used by the perpetrators to blackmail the subjects into performing other sexual acts, to coerce them into continuing a relationship or to punish them for ending one, to silence them, to damage their reputation, and/or for financial gain. In the wake of civil lawsuits and the increasing numbers of reported incidents, legislation has been passed in a number of countries and jurisdictions to outlaw the practice, though approaches have varied and been changed over the years. The practice has also been described as a form of psychological abuse and domestic violence, as well as a form of sexual abuse.

Revenge porn most commonly refers to the uploading of sexually explicit material to the Internet to humiliate and intimidate a subject who has broken off a relationship. The term is however also often broadly used to describe non-revenge scenarios, including nonconsensual pornography distributed by hackers or by individuals seeking profit or notoriety (often formally referred to as non-consensual intimate imagery, NCII, or image-based sexual abuse, IBSA). The images are usually accompanied by sufficient information to identify the target individual (a process known as doxing), typically names and locations, and can include risqué comments, links to social media profiles, home addresses, and workplaces. In some cases, victims are exposed to workplace discrimination, cyberstalking or physical attack. Some companies search the Internet for potential sources of bad publicity, resulting in many victims of revenge porn losing their jobs and finding themselves effectively unhirable. Some academics argue that the term "revenge porn" should not be used, and instead that it should be referred to as "image-based sexual abuse."

Jurisdictions which have passed laws against revenge porn include Canada, Germany, Italy, Israel, Singapore, Spain, the United Kingdom, the United States (49 out of 50 states of the United States, Washington, D.C., the U.S. military and U.S. overseas territories including Puerto Rico and Guam). Australia has also passed a law at the Commonwealth level that commenced on 1 September 2018. The Australian states and territories of South Australia, Victoria, New South Wales, the Australian Capital Territory, the Northern Territory, Queensland, Western Australia, and Tasmania, have complementary state level laws that criminalize this behaviour. Furthermore, Australia also has a civil penalties scheme.

In recent years, the rise of computer-generated imagery and synthetic media technology has raised concerns about the rise of revenge porn made using deepfake pornography techniques. As of 2023 in the U.S. states of New York, Virginia, and California, it is illegal to disseminate pornographic images created using image generation technology without the consent of subjects depicted in the image. In fact, law enforcement officials in San Francisco have initiated lawsuits against websites offering "undressing" image generation used to make deepfake porn.

== Background ==
In the 1980s, Hustler magazine began a monthly feature of reader-submitted images of naked women called "Beaver Hunt". Beaver Hunt photographs were often accompanied by details about the woman, like her hobbies, her sexual fantasies, and sometimes her name. Not all of the women featured in Beaver Hunt submitted their own images and several women sued the magazine for publishing their photographs without their permission, or without verifying information on forged consent forms.

Two decades later, Italian researcher Sergio Messina identified "realcore pornography", a new genre consisting of images and videos of ex-girlfriends distributed through Usenet groups. In 2008, amateur porn aggregator XTube began receiving complaints that pornographic content had been posted without subjects' consent. Several sites began staging consensual pornography to resemble revenge porn, as well as hosting "authentic" user-submitted content.

Revenge porn began garnering international media attention when Hunter Moore launched the website IsAnyoneUp in 2010. The site featured user-submitted images, and was one of the first sites to adopt the model initiated by Beaver Hunt: IsAnyoneUp often included identifying information, such as the subjects' names, employers, addresses and links to social networking profiles. Activist Charlotte Laws was the first person to speak out against Moore and one of the first people to publicly support revenge porn victims. This prompted backlash from some of Moore's devotees, who stalked Laws and sent her death threats. Laws became known around the world as the "Erin Brockovich of revenge porn" and she was one of the first activists to meet with legislators in an effort to get laws passed against revenge porn.

In February 2015, the social media site and online bulletin board Reddit announced a change to its privacy policy to ban the posting of sexually explicit content without the consent of those depicted. The announcement was made after a company meeting at which the issue of "illicit pornography—pictures and video—was a burning one". In March 2015, Twitter followed suit with new rules to address the posting of unauthorized content and specifically revenge porn. Starting March 11 of that year, Twitter stated it would immediately remove "any 'link to a photograph, video, or digital image of you in a state of nudity or engaged in any act of sexual conduct' that has been posted without consent." According to a Washington Post article, the changes were in response to growing concerns "that [Twitter] has not done enough to prevent bad behavior on its site."

In June 2015, Google announced it would remove links to revenge porn on request. Microsoft followed suit in July. Both have placed forms on-line for victims to complete. Together the two organizations account for nearly 90% of the internet search market in the U.S.

The term "revenge porn" is controversial because those who share images without permission may be motivated by profit, notoriety, entertainment, or other goals besides revenge; and because not all visual depictions of nudity or sexual activity are pornographic.

== Advocacy ==
The website endrevengeporn.org was founded by Holly Jacobs, a revenge porn victim, to campaign for the criminalization of revenge porn, which it considered a form of sexual abuse. Jacobs also founded the Cyber Civil Rights Initiative (CCRI), a nonprofit organization that seeks to challenge cyber harassment. Danielle Citron, known for her discourse on cyber harassment as a civil rights issue, the vice-president of the CCRI. Mary Anne Franks, CCRI's president and Legislative & Tech Policy Director, has been heavily involved with legislative and policy efforts to combat revenge porn. Dr. Laura Hilly and Kira Allmann of the Oxford Human Rights Hub have characterized revenge porn as a kind of gendered hate speech designed to silence women. An article of theirs argues that this stifling of free expression is often ignored in debates over revenge porn. Dr. Charlotte Laws, often called "the Erin Brockovich of revenge porn", was a CCRI board member until 2016. She is perhaps the first victims' advocate and one of the first to meet with elected officials in an effort to get legislation passed against nonconsensual pornography.

Katie Hill, U.S. representative for California, announced in late 2019 she would advocate against revenge porn.

While not solely focused on revenge porn, the non-profit organization Without My Consent provided legal resources related to it and lobbies to protect the privacy and free speech rights of online harassment victims. In 2019, Without My Consent ceased operating and transferred to CCRI all of the comprehensive resources it had developed to aid victims of online abuse. Since 2012, there has also been a website Women Against Revenge Porn, calling itself "not an organization or a business", which has been cited as an advocacy group for people exposed in revenge porn. In late 2014, Elisa D'Amico and David Bateman, partners at the law firm K&L Gates, launched the Cyber Civil Rights Legal Project (CCRLP), a project offering free legal help to victims of revenge porn.

To better facilitate the introduction of relevant legislation, some anti-revenge porn activists have called upon others in their community to use gender-neutral language more often when discussing the issue. The term "revenge porn" itself has also come under fire. The CCRI for instance prefers the term "nonconsensual pornography". In analogy with "child sexual abuse images" being the preferred term for child pornography, McGlynn and Rackley proposed "image-based sexual abuse". Along with journalist Sarah Jeong, they have argued that it is harmful to associate revenge porn with pornography which revolves around consent. Jeong also considers it a mistake for activists to focus on revenge porn itself as the main problem, rather than the underlying culture which leads to its subjects being socially ostracized.

In the Australian Capital Territory, an electronic petition was started in March 2017 that called upon the A.C.T. Legislative Assembly to consider criminalizing the non-consensual disclosure of sexual images and videos. The A.C.T Legislative Assembly consequently passed the Crimes (Intimate Image Abuse) Amendment Act (2017) (ACT) that criminalised the distribution, or threatened distribution, of intimate photos and videos on 16 August 2017.

== Legislation ==
Laws banning revenge porn have been slow to emerge. Contributing factors include a lack of understanding about the gravity of the problem, free speech concerns, belief that existing law provides adequate protection, a lack of care, historically, for women's issues, and "misunderstandings of First Amendment doctrine" (Citron & Franks). The American Civil Liberties Union and the Electronic Frontier Foundation have drawn attention to the implications for free speech if legislation is too broad.

One concern with revenge porn laws is that they may not be tailored narrowly enough to satisfy the strict scrutiny applicable to content-based restrictions on speech. Prohibition of revenge porn may not be constitutional according to the Miller v. California decision if the porn does not categorically appeal to the prurient interest; if it is not, in itself, patently offensive; or if it has literary or political value.

=== Africa ===
In South Africa, the Films and Publications Amendment Act, 2019 makes it a crime to distribute a private sexual photograph or film without the consent of the pictured individual and with the intent to cause them harm. The penalty is a fine of up to R150,000 and/or up to two years' imprisonment; or double that if the victim is identifiable in the photograph or film.

=== Asia ===
==== Japan ====
Japan passed a bill in November 2014 which made it a crime to communicate "a private sexual image of another person" without consent.

==== Philippines ====
Since 2009, the Philippines has criminalized copying, reproducing, sharing or exhibiting sexually explicit images or videos over the Internet without written consent of the individual depicted.

==== Singapore ====
Singapore passed the Criminal Law Reform Act on 6 May 2019, which includes the criminalisation of revenge porn. Penalties include a jail term of up to five years with fines and caning as a sentencing option. If the crime is committed against a victim under 14 years of age, a mandatory jail term will be imposed. The Act took effect on 1 January 2020.

==== South Korea ====
In South Korea the distribution of revenge porn is punishable by up to three years' imprisonment or by a fine of up to 5 million South Korean won. If the subject is filmed illicitly the penalty is up to ten years in prison or a fine of up to 10 million won ($8,900; £6,900). The use of hidden cameras for illicitly filming people, known as "molka", is widespread in the country and in 2018 more than 6,000 incidents of spy-cam porn were being reported to the police annually, with only 2% of reported cases leading to a prison sentence. The website Sora.net specialised in the publishing of spy-cam porn until it was banned in 2016 following a campaign against it. Some of those depicted had committed suicide. In May 2018, ten thousand women demonstrated in Seoul demanding increased official action against digital sex crime. In October 2018 a petition of over 200,000 signatories called for increased punishment for the possession of revenge porn, regardless of whether it had been distributed.

=== Australia ===
Sharing sexual images or videos without consent is unlawful under three different, but parallel, types of law in Australia; the Civil Law, the Criminal Law, and a Civil Penalties scheme.

Under the Civil Law, the Supreme Court of Western Australia decision in the case of Wilson v Ferguson, delivered on 16 January 2015, is specific precedent that establishes that the non-consensual publication of sexual images or videos on the internet is unlawful. In that case, a defendant shared sexual images and videos of the plaintiff on social media. The Court decided that the publication of "explicit images of a former partner which had been confidentially shared between the sexual partners during their relationship" constituted a breach of an equitable obligation of confidence. The Court granted an injunction prohibiting further publication and awarded equitable compensation to the plaintiff. The defendant was found liable for A$48,404 in damages, plus costs. This case was successfully argued on grounds previously established by the case of Giller v Procopets, which was argued on the equity of breach of confidence and tort grounds.

Under the Criminal Law, the Parliaments in the Australian States and Territories of South Australia, Victoria, New South Wales, the Australian Capital Territory, the Northern Territory, Queensland, Western Australia, and Tasmania, have all passed laws that amend the relevant statutory criminal law to criminalise the non-consensual sharing of sexual images or videos. Furthermore, the Parliament of Australia has also passed a law that amends the Commonwealth statutory criminal law (which operates in parallel to State and Territory criminal law) to criminalise the non-consensual sharing of sexual images or videos. Most jurisdictions provide for higher sentences where the image that is shared is of a child. The particular law in each of these jurisdictions is described below, in chronological order of their enactment.

In March 2013, the Parliament of South Australia passed the Summary Offences (Filming Offences) Amendment Act (2013) (SA) that specifically created a criminal offence for distributing an invasive image or video without consent, which commenced on 10 May 2013. The distribution of an invasive image offence is contained in s. 26C of the Summary Offences Act (1953) (SA), and the maximum penalty is A$10,000 or imprisonment for 2 years. In September 2016, the Parliament of South Australia further passed the Summary Offences (Filming and Sexting Offences) Amendment Act (2016) to create a criminal offence for threatening to distribute an invasive image or video, which commenced on 28 October 2018. The threatening to distribute offence is contained in s. 26DA of the Summary Offences Act (1953) (SA), and the maximum penalty is A$5,000 or imprisonment for 1 year.

On 15 October 2014, the Parliament of Victoria passed the Crimes Amendment (Sexual Offences and Other Matters) Act (2014) (Vic) that created specific criminal offences for distributing, or threatening to distribute, a sexual image or video without consent, which commenced on 3 November 2014 (and was repealed on 6 September 2022). The distribution of an intimate image offence was contained in s. 41DA of the Summary Offences Act (1966) (Vic), and the maximum penalty was imprisonment for 2 years. The threatening to distribute an intimate image offence was contained in s. 41DB of the Summary Offences Act (1966) (Vic), and the maximum penalty was imprisonment for 1 year. On 30 August 2022, the Parliament of Victoria further passed the Justice Legislation Amendment (Sexual Offences and Other Matters) Act (2022) (Vic) that amended the Summary Offences Act (1966) (Vic), which commenced on 30 July 2023. The amendment relocated the criminal offence of distributing an intimate image to s. 53S of the Crimes Act (1958) (Vic), and the offence of threatening to distribute an intimate image to s. 53T of the Crimes Act (1958) (Vic). The maximum penalty for either offence is imprisonment for 3 years. This Act also created a specific criminal offence for producing an intimate image without consent. The producing an intimate image offence is contained in s. 53R of the Crimes Act (1958) (Vic), and the maximum penalty is imprisonment for 3 years. Furthermore, this Act created a disposal order scheme. The intimate image disposal order is contained in s. 53Z of the Crimes Act (1958) (Vic).

On 21 June 2017, the Parliament of New South Wales passed the Crimes Amendment (Intimate Images) Act (2017) (NSW) that created specific criminal offences for distributing, or threatening to distribute, or threatening to record, an intimate image or video without consent, and provided for Rectification Orders that empower a Court to order the removal and destruction of the intimate image or video, which commenced on 28 August 2017. The distribution of an intimate image offence is contained in s. 91Q of the Crimes Act (1900) (NSW), and the maximum penalty is an A$11,000 fine, or imprisonment for 3 years, or both. The threatening to distribute, or threatening to record an intimate image offences, are contained in s. 91R of the Crimes Act (1900) (NSW), and the maximum penalty for either offences is an A$11,000 fine, or imprisonment for 3 years, or both. The contravention of a Rectification Order offence is contained in s. 91S of the Crimes Act (1900) (NSW), and the maximum penalty is an A$5,500 fine, or imprisonment for 2 years, or both.

On 16 August 2017, the Legislative Assembly of the Australian Capital Territory passed the Crimes (Intimate Image Abuse) Amendment Act (2017) (ACT) that created specific criminal offences for distributing, or threatening to distribute, or threatening to capture, an intimate image or video without consent, and provided for Rectification Orders that empower a Court to order the removal and destruction of the intimate image or video, which commenced on 30 August 2017. The distribution of an intimate image offence is contained in s. 72C of the Crimes Act (1900) (ACT), and the maximum penalty is A$45,000 or imprisonment for 3 years, or both. The threatening to distribute, or threatening to capture, an intimate image offences are contained in s. 72E of the Crimes Act (1900) (ACT), and the maximum penalty is A$45,000 or imprisonment for 3 years, or both. The contravention of a Rectification Order offence is contained in s. 72H of the Crimes Act (1900) (ACT), and the maximum penalty is an A$30,000 fine, or imprisonment for 2 years, or both.

On 22 March 2018, the Legislative Assembly of the Northern Territory passed the Criminal Code Amendment (Intimate Images) Act (2018) (NT) that created specific criminal offences for distributing, or threatening to distribute, an intimate image or video without consent, and provided for Rectification Orders that empower a Court to order the removal and destruction of the intimate image or video, which commenced on 9 May 2018. The distribution of an intimate image offence is contained in s. 208AB of the Criminal Code Act (1983) (NT), and the maximum penalty is imprisonment for 3 years. The threatening to distribute an intimate image offence is contained in s. 208AC of the Criminal Code Act (1983) (NT), and the maximum penalty is imprisonment for 3 years. The contravention of a Rectification Order offence is contained in s. 208AE of the Criminal Code Act (1983) (NT), and the maximum penalty is imprisonment for 2 years.

On 16 August 2018, the Parliament of the Commonwealth of Australia passed the Enhancing Online Safety (Non‑consensual Sharing of Intimate Images) Act (2018) (Cth) that created specific criminal offences (that operates in parallel to State and Territory criminal law) for distributing, or threatening to distribute, a sexual image or video without consent, which commenced on 1 September 2018. The distribution of a private sexual image offence is contained in s. 474.17A of the Criminal Code Act (1995) (Cth), and the maximum penalty is imprisonment for 5 years.

On 13 February 2019, the Parliament of Queensland passed the Criminal Code (Non-consensual Sharing of Intimate Images) Amendment Act (2019) (Qld) that created specific criminal offences for distributing, or threatening to distribute, an intimate image or video without consent, and provided for Rectification Orders that empower a Court to order the removal and destruction of the intimate image or video, which commenced on 21 February 2019. The distribution of an intimate image offence is contained in s. 223 of the Criminal Code Act (1899) (Qld), and the maximum penalty is imprisonment for 3 years. The threatening to distribute an intimate image offence is contained in s. 229A of the Criminal Code Act (1899) (Qld), and the maximum penalty is imprisonment for 3 years. The contravention of a Rectification Order offence is contained in s. 229AA of the Criminal Code Act (1899) (Qld), and the maximum penalty is imprisonment for 2 years.

On 19 February 2019, the Parliament of Western Australia passed the Criminal Law Amendment (Intimate Images) Act (2018) (WA) that created specific criminal offences for distributing, or threatening to distribute, an intimate image or video without consent, and provided for Rectification Orders that empower a Court to order the removal and destruction of the intimate image or video, which commenced on 15 April 2019. The distribution of an intimate image offence is contained in s. 221BD of the Criminal Code Act Compilation Act (1913) (WA), and the maximum penalty is imprisonment for 3 years. The threatening to distribute an intimate image offence is contained in s. 338 of the Criminal Code Act Compilation Act (1913) (WA), and the maximum penalty is imprisonment for 3 years. The contravention of a Rectification Order offence is contained in s. 221BE of the Criminal Code Act Compilation Act (1913) (WA), and the maximum penalty is imprisonment for 1 year and an A$12,000 fine.

On 19 September 2019, the Parliament of Tasmania passed the Criminal Code Amendment (Bullying) Act (2019) (Tas) that extended the criminal offence of stalking to include distributing an offensive image or video, which commenced on 8 September 2019. The distribution of an offensive image offence is contained in s. 192(1) of the Criminal Code Act (1924) (Tas), and the offence is a serious indictable crime that can only be tried on indictment in the Supreme Court. The threat offence is contained in s. 192(1)(ea) of the Criminal Code Act (1924) (Tas), and the offence is a serious indictable crime that can only be tried on indictment in the Supreme Court.

Under the civil penalties scheme, Australians can report the posting, or threatened posting, of sexual images and videos without consent, to the Australian Government Office of the eSafety Commissioner. The eSafety Commissioner is empowered to receive and investigate complaints, issue take-down notices, and enforce civil penalties against individuals and corporations who fail to comply. In July 2015, the Australian Government established the Office of the eSafety Commissioner. In October 2017, the Office of the eSafety Commissioner launched the Image Based Abuse online reporting portal, which enables Australians to report non-consensually shared sexual images and videos that had been posted to social media, or websites, and enables the eSafety Commissioner to seek their removal. On 16 August 2018, the Parliament of Australia passed Enhancing Online Safety (Non‑consensual Sharing of Intimate Images) Act (2018) (Cth) that establishes a civil penalties scheme. Under this law, the eSafety Commissioner is empowered to investigate a complaint, or an objection, regarding the non-consensual sharing of intimate images or videos on social media, by email or SMS/MMS, on websites, or peer-to-peer file-sharing services. Furthermore, under this law, a person who non-consensually posts, or threatens to post, an intimate image or video may be liable for a civil penalty. This law also empowers the eSafety Commissioner to issue removal notices requiring providers of a social media service, a relevant electronic service, or a designated internet service, to remove the intimate image from the service. Similar powers can be enforced against end-users, and hosting service providers. Civil penalties for individuals are up to a maximum of A$105,000 and for corporations are up to a maximum of A$525,000.

=== North America ===
==== Canada ====
In 2014, with the passage of the Protecting Canadians from Online Crime Act, Canada criminalized the "non-consensual distribution of intimate images" that were made under a "reasonable expectation of privacy".

==== United States ====
Tort, privacy, copyright, and criminal laws offer remedies against people who submit revenge porn. 49 states (all except South Carolina) have laws against revenge porn as of June 2024. For example, New Jersey law prohibits both the capture and the distribution of sexually explicit photographs and films by any person, "knowing that he is not licensed or privileged to do so" and without the subjects' consent. The law was used to prosecute Dharun Ravi, the Rutgers student who distributed webcam footage of his roommate Tyler Clementi engaging in sexual activity, after which Clementi died by suicide. The law has also been used to prosecute several men who allegedly distributed revenge porn of their ex-girlfriends.

Mary Anne Franks, a law professor and constitutional scholar who drafted the model legislation and advised legislators in the majority of the above states, emphasizes that many of these laws are still deeply flawed.

Representatives from the Department of Justice, California's Office of the Attorney General, 50 major technology companies, victim advocates, and legislative and law enforcement leaders joined in 2015 to form a Cyber Exploitation Working Group, and have announced the creation of a working hub "to combat so-called cyber exploitation – the practice of anonymously posting explicit photographs of others online, often to extort money from the victims."

As of October 1, 2022, a new section of the US Federal Code, 15 U.S.C. § 6851 Civil action relating to disclosure of intimate images, went into effect. This was passed via Section 1309 of the Consolidated Appropriations Act, 2022 and amended the Violence Against Women Act, allowing victims of revenge porn to file civil suits against those who released the materials. Victims may sue for up to US$150,000 in actual damages as well as legal fees; restraining orders and injunctions may also be issued to temporarily or permanently halt any further distribution or disclosure. It is the first Federal law concerning revenge porn and helps address the patchwork of state laws in effect at the time of its passage. The burden of bringing such a suit is still on the victim and the code does not formally criminalize the release of revenge porn. Communications platforms, including websites, would be liable if they solicited such material or if they deal predominantly in revenge porn. Importantly, the legal code includes specific wording which holds that a victim's allowance of such materials to be created and any instances where the victim shared that material with specific individuals do not imply wholesale consent to share the material with any other individuals, two commonly anticipated defenses which defendants may raise.

In July 2024, the bipartisan TAKE IT DOWN Act was introduced in the U.S. Senate. The act would provide federal protections to victims of AI-generated deep-fake pornography. It would criminalize the publication of AI-generated deep-fake images without the subject's consent. In addition, it would require social media sites to create processes for victims to have deep-fake images removed. Though it failed to pass both Houses by the end of 2024, it was reintroduced in 2025, unanimously passed the Senate and passed the House on a 409-2 vote by April 28, 2025. President Donald Trump signed the act into law on May 19, 2025.

Observers have also noted the shame which may make many victims reluctant to report or pursue such investigations. While victims of sexual abuse can have their identities kept out of court proceedings, which will only refer to them as Jane Doe or John Doe, few such safeguards exist for victims of revenge porn. Depending on jurisdiction, images in court cases may be entered as evidence and become publicly viewable. Suggestions have been made to revise evidentiary laws to allow anonymization of plaintiffs and de-identification of images entered as evidence. 15 U.S.C. § 6851 specifically allowed for injunctions to preserve plaintiff anonymity when filing civil suits in Federal court.

===== Criminal prosecutions =====
Several well-known revenge porn websites, including IsAnyoneUp and the Texxxan, have been taken down in response to actual or threatened legal action. The former was investigated by the FBI after anti-revenge porn activist Charlotte Laws uncovered a hacking scheme associated with the website. Indictments for fifteen felonies were handed down under the Computer Fraud and Abuse Act in January 2014 for the site owner and his accomplices, and the trial was initially set to begin in November 2014 in Los Angeles. Hunter Moore, the owner of IsAnyoneUp pleaded guilty to hacking and identity theft in early 2015. Moore was sentenced to two and a half years in prison on 2 December 2015. By May 2017, Moore was out of prison.

In December 2013, California Attorney General Kamala Harris charged Kevin Bollaert, who ran the revenge porn website UGotPosted, with 31 felony counts, including extortion and identity theft. In March 2014, because the victim was under eighteen years old in the photos, a court in Ohio awarded damages of $385,000 against Bollaert. In April 2015 Bollaert was sentenced to 18 years in prison. "Sitting behind a computer, committing what is essentially a cowardly and criminal act, will not shield predators from the law or jail", said Attorney General Harris following the verdict. Also in California, a man named Noe Iniguez was given jail time for posting a naked photo of his ex-girlfriend on her employer's Facebook page.

Casey Meyering, the operator of revenge porn website WinByState, was arrested in Oklahoma in 2014 and extradited to Napa County. Meyering's website invited users to submit nude photos of ex-girlfriends and other women, with the photos categorized by state. He would then make the women featured on his website pay $250 to have their photos taken down. There were about 400 images of California women on the website, including at least one in Napa Valley, where California Attorney General Kamala Harris had filed the case. After originally pleading not guilty, on 8 May 2015, the 28-year-old man pleaded no contest to one count of extortion, three counts of attempted extortion, and one count of conspiracy. He was sentenced to three years' imprisonment as of early June 2015.

In August 2023, a jury in Harris County, Texas, returned a $1.2 billion verdict on behalf of a woman identified as "D.L." or "Jane Doe" in court filings. The unanimous verdict found that Marques Jamal Jackson had distributed revenge porn in violation of the Texas' revenge porn law. The verdict included $200 million in compensatory damages and $1 billion in punitive damages. According to the lawsuit, Jackson posted images of his former girlfriend on social media platforms and websites, including a pornography site, and in a public Dropbox folder. He created fake social media pages and email accounts to share the material with her family, friends and co-workers and sent them a link to the Dropbox folder. He also tagged her employer and personal gym on social media posts.

===== Tort and privacy law =====
States without specific laws about revenge porn have seen lawsuits alleging invasion of privacy, public disclosure of private fact and intentional infliction of emotional distress against the individuals who uploaded the images. Forty states, including California, New Jersey, and New York, have anti-cyberharassment laws that may be applicable to cases of revenge porn.

In February 2014, a US$500,000 settlement was awarded to a Texas woman who brought suit against her ex-boyfriend for posting video and photos of her on the Internet. The state did not have a specific "revenge porn" law at the time of the lawsuit. California has a private right of action in tort for acts of revenge pornography within the civil code, as well as a specific criminal statute punishing revenge pornography as an invasion of privacy.

===== Communications Decency Act §230 =====
Some revenge porn lawsuits have named service providers and websites as defendants alongside individuals who uploaded the images. Section 230 (§230) of the Communications Decency Act shields websites and service providers from liability for content posted by users providing they are not themselves co-creators of the content. If user-generated content posted to a website does not violate copyright or federal criminal laws, sites have no obligation to remove the content under §230.

===== Copyright =====
According to a survey conducted by the Cyber Civil Rights Initiative, an estimated 80% of revenge porn pictures and videos are taken by the subjects themselves. Those individuals can bring actions for copyright infringement against the person who uploaded their nude or semi-nude "selfies". American victims may file Digital Millennium Copyright Act takedown notices with service providers. Revenge porn site MyEx.com has been a defendant in a copyright infringement case.

===== First Amendment and anti-SLAPP =====
Some free speech advocates object to revenge porn laws on First Amendment grounds, citing the fact that US laws restricting expression have a history of being overturned. Journalist Sarah Jeong argues that new criminal laws meant to combat revenge porn are likely to be overbroad, resulting in unintended consequences.

Revenge porn uploaders and websites may also challenge lawsuits using state protections against strategic lawsuit against public participations (anti-SLAPP laws), which allow defendants to counter lawsuits aimed at stifling free speech.

=== Europe ===
Many European countries have broad privacy statutes that may be applicable to revenge porn. France also criminalizes the willful violation of the intimate private life of another by "transmitting the picture of a person who is within a private place, without the consent of the person concerned". A German High Court made a May 2014 ruling that intimate photographs of partners should be deleted if the partner so requests. In 2019, after a citizen-led campaign, Italy approved a law punishing whoever disseminates images or videos with sexually explicit content, intended to remain private, without the consent of the persons represented, with a jail sentence from one to six years and a fine from €5,000 to €15,000.

==== Germany ====
In Germany "Revenge porn" is illegal. It is prosecuted using several existing laws, rather than one specific offence. Section 201a of the Criminal Code is the main one used.

==== Ireland ====
In 2020 Ireland passed the Harassment, Harmful Communications and Related Offences Act 2020, which introduced two new criminal offences:

1. The taking, distribution, publication or threat to distribute intimate images without consent, and with intent to cause harm to the victim - this carries a maximum penalty of an unlimited fine and/or seven years imprisonment.
2. The taking, distribution or publication of intimate images without consent without a requirement that the person intended to cause harm to the victim - this carries a maximum penalty of a fine of €5,000 fine and/or up to twelve months in prison.

It is irrelevant if a person consented to the taking of an image if they did not consent to it being later being distributed.

It is an aggravating factor for sentencing if the perpetrator was in an intimate relationship with the victim.

The bill came into effect in 2021.

==== Malta ====
A law criminalising revenge porn in Malta entered into force in November 2016. Article 208E of the Maltese Criminal Code punishes whoever, with an intent to cause distress, emotional harm or harm of any nature, discloses a private sexual photograph or film without the consent of the person or persons displayed or depicted in such photograph or film. Such person would, on conviction be liable to imprisonment for a term of up to two years or to a fine of not less than €3,000 and not more than €5,000, or to both such imprisonment and fine.

==== United Kingdom ====
===== England and Wales =====
In 2012, the English singer-songwriter Tulisa Contostavlos obtained an injunction preventing the distribution of a sex tape of her and a former lover that had been published on the internet. The case was set to include considerable damages, but was settled out of court before it could be considered.

In April 2014, UK charities including The National Stalking Helpline, Women's Aid, and the UK Safer Internet Centre reported increased use of revenge porn websites. Women's Aid Charity Chief Executive Polly Neate stated, "To be meaningful, any attempt to tackle revenge porn must also take account of all other kinds of psychological abuse and controlling behaviour, and revenge porn is just another form of coercive control. That control is central to domestic violence, which is why we're campaigning for all psychological abuse and coercive control to be criminalised". In July Chris Grayling, the Secretary of State for Justice, announced plans to "take appropriate action" to address revenge porn in Britain. A House of Lords Committee, in a report on social media and the law, subsequently called for clarification from the DPP as to when revenge porn becomes a crime.

The Criminal Justice and Courts Act 2015 received Royal Assent. Section 33 of the Act makes it an offence in England and Wales to disclose private sexual photographs and films without the consent of the individual depicted and with the intent to cause distress. There is a maximum sentence of two years' imprisonment.

On 23 April 2015, a seminar was held in Westminster on the new legislation. The seminar was organised by the Oxford Human Rights Hub and co-hosted with the law firm McAllister Olivarius, the End Violence Against Women Coalition, the University of Durham, and the University of Birmingham. The seminar called for the law to be extended to cover upskirting, a change that was subsequently made with the passing of the Voyeurism (Offences) Act 2019.

In June 2015 Chrissy Chambers, a YouTube star from the United States, pursued a civil suit against her British ex-boyfriend who posted sexually-explicit videos taken without her knowledge or consent to Facebook where they were repeatedly shared. Chambers chose to pursue a civil case as the Criminal Justice and Courts Act 2015 does not apply retroactively to content posted prior to its passage. She was represented by McAllister Olivarius and in January 2018 won "substantial damages". Drawing on this and other cases, Dr. Ann Olivarius of the same firm gave a TEDxReading talk on "Revenge Porn: The Naked Truth".

Between April 2015 (the date that section 33 of the Criminal Justice and Courts Act 2015 came into force) and December 2015 the number of reported incidents of revenge pornography in England and Wales was 1,160. However, 61% of them resulted in no action being taken and the number of people prosecuted for disclosing private sexual images during the legislation's first year was 206. It emerged that cases of those who had been victims of revenge porn before April 2015 were not pursued under the new law, causing criticism that perpetrators "got away with" their crimes when committed before the Act came into force. Before April 2015, the law most applicable to revenge porn, specifically image-based sexual abuse, was the 1988 Malicious Communication Act, and "With police officers' understanding of revenge porn now being based on the newer legislation, prosecution under the Malicious Communications Act for similar cases is less likely to be considered. And so police officers may be less likely to consider alternative legislation for those cases which predate April 2015."

The Revenge Porn Helpline was set up in 2015. In 2019 it was announced that the Law Commission would examine the possibility of reclassifying revenge porn from a "communications crime" to a sexual offence, thus giving victims anonymity.

===== Scotland =====
In Scotland, revenge porn became a specific offence in April 2016 with the adoption of the Abusive Behaviour and Sexual Harm Act, which came into force in July 2017.

===== Northern Ireland =====
In Northern Ireland, revenge porn was made a crime in February 2016 through the amendment of an existing law.

== Prenuptial agreements ==
Some couples draft "social media" prenuptial agreements, which may include provisions relating to revenge porn. Clauses may state that couples agree not to share photos or posts that are likely to harm a spouse's professional reputation.

== In other media ==
The novel The Drowning Pool (1950) by Ross Macdonald, part of the series starring fictional detective Lew Archer, features a subplot of a woman trying to stop distribution of a sexual film taken without her knowledge.

In S1E5 of the television series Sex Education, an intimate image of a high school student is distributed to her classmates with the threat of revealing her identity. Several characters work together to find the culprit. During the school assembly at the end of the episode, many students claim that the image is of them to protect their classmate.

In 2021, the BBC film Zara McDermott: Revenge Porn came out, in which Zara McDermott recalled the experience of having her nude photos leaked as a teenager.

== See also ==
- Fake nude photography
- Online shaming
- Participatory surveillance
- Deepfake pornography
- Generative AI pornography
