= Private city =

Privately owned, for-profit enterprise

A private city is a city organized as a for-profit, private enterprise with no elected city councilors.

== Examples ==
=== Tanzania ===
- Fumba Town.
- Dunia Cyber City.

=== Zimbabwe ===
- Zim Cyber City.

=== Kenya ===
- Tatu City.
- Konza Technopolis.
- Mwale Medical and Technology City.

=== Bhutan ===
Gelephu Mindfulness City.

=== Venezuela ===
CryptoCity.

=== Nigeria ===
- Eko Atlantic, owned by Ako Atlantic Development Company.
- Itana, owned by Itana Company.
- Centenary City, owned by Centenary City FTZ

=== Kyrgyzstan ===
A special investment territory has been announced for Tamchy.

=== Kazakhstan ===
- Alatau City, owned by Caspian Group.
- Nurkent co-owned by COSCO.

=== India ===
- GIFT City, co-owned by Brigade Group.
- Lavasa, owned by Lavasa Corp.
- Cyber City Gurgaon.
- Aamby Valley City

=== Pakistan ===
- Bahria Town, owned by Bahria Town PLC.

=== Egypt ===
- Ras el-Hekma, owned by Abu Dhabi Developmental Holding Company.
- Al Rehab, owned by Talaat Moustafa Group.
- El Gouna, owned by Orascom Development.
- New Administrative Capital

=== Saudi Arabia ===
- King Abdullah Economic City, being developed by Emaar Properties and listed on KSA's stock exchange.
- Neom, owned by the PIF.
- Jeddah Economic City

=== Cambodia ===
- Grand Phnom Penh City, owned by Chip Mong Group.
- Phnom Penh City Center, Shukaku Inc.

=== The Philippines ===
- Bonifacio Global City
- Eastwood City
- Filinvest City
- New Clark City
- Nuvali
- Rockwell Center
- Arcovia City
- Araneta City
- Newport City

=== South Korea ===
- Songdo, owned by New Songdo International City Development LLC.

=== Japan ===
- Woven City, owned by Woven by Toyota.

=== Honduras ===
- Próspera, owned by Honduras Próspera Inc.

=== China ===
- Jialong, owned by Jialong Corp.

=== Vietnam ===
- Phú Mỹ Hưng urban area, owned by Phu My Hung Development Corporation.
- Ciputra Hanoi International City, owned by Ciputra Group a local company.
- Ecopark (Vietnam).

=== Laos ===
- That Luang Marsh SEZ, owned by Shanghai Wan Feng Group.

=== Malaysia ===
- Forest City, Johor, owned by Country Garden.
- Sunway City

=== Indonesia ===
- Bintaro Jaya
- BSD City
- Summarecon City
- Lippo Karawaci and Lippo Cikarang.
- Alam Sutera, Gading Serpong, Sentul City, Kota Deltamas, Kota Jababeka, and Pantai Indah Kapuk (PIK).
- Nusantara.

== See also ==
- Charter city
- Private town
- Songdo
- Forest City, Johor
- Free Private Cities
- Neocameralism
