= Titus Gebel =

German entrepreneur and political activist (born 1967)

- Born: June 19, 1967 (age 59); Würzburg, Germany.
- Education: University of Heidelberg
- Occupations: Entrepreneur, Lawyer
- Children: 2
- Website: titusgebel.com

Titus Gebel (born 1967 in Würzburg) is a German entrepreneur, lawyer, political activist and publicist. He is the former CEO of Deutsche Rohstoff AG and Managing Director of Rhein Petroleum GmbH.

== Life ==
Gebel earned his doctorate at the University of Heidelberg at the Max Planck Institute for Comparative Public Law and International Law. He then worked as a manager for various companies in the biotechnology, venture capital and commodities industry.

In 2006, he founded Deutsche Rohstoff AG with Thomas Gutschlag and served as CEO until 2014. The company initially participated in exploration and development projects and later built its own production, primarily in Australia and the US (gold, silver, tungsten, molybdenum, petroleum, natural gas). The company has been listed on the Frankfurt Stock Exchange since 2010 and generated an annual turnover of 108 million euros in 2018. Rhein Petroleum GmbH was founded in 2007 to put oilfields in southern Germany back into operation and began production in 2018.

== Free Private Cities ==
In his 2018 book, Free Private Cities, Gebel modified Paul Romer's Charter City concept, which has so far found no implementation. This leads Gebel back to the unwillingness of states to allow administrative officials of a third state to fulfill sovereign tasks in their own territory.

Instead, in a so-called free private city, a private company offers residents protection of life, liberty, and property in a demarcated area as "government service providers". This service includes security and rescue services, a legal and regulatory framework and independent dispute resolution. The residents pay a contractually fixed amount for these services per year. The public service provider as operator of the community can not unilaterally change the contract later. The so-called contract citizens have a legal claim that is respected and a claim for damages in case of poor performance by the private city. Disputes between them and the government service provider are brought before independent arbitration tribunals, as is customary in international commercial law. If the operator ignores the arbitration award or misuses its power in another way, its customers leave and the operator goes bankrupt.

The free private city concept has been discussed in a positive way in the media landscape, but it has also been criticized as neocolonialist.

As the first attempt at the practical implementation of his free private city model, between 2017 and 2019 Gebel worked as the Chief Legal Officer for Honduras Próspera Inc., the operating company of Próspera, a Zone for Employment and Economic Development in Honduras. Gebel is also involved in attempts to launch similar projects on several continents. He is the Founder and CEO of Tipolis, a Singapore-based company focused on negotiating with governments to establish free private cities around the world under the brand name International Cities by Tipolis. He is also the President of the Free Cities Foundation, a non-profit entity working to popularize the free private city concept among other so-called "free city models" such as startup cities, charter cities, seasteads, and intentional communities.

== Publications ==
- Der Treuhandgedanke und die Bewahrung der biologischen Vielfalt. Pro Universitate, Berlin 1998, ISBN 978-3932490392.
- Free Private Cities: Making Governments Compete For You. Aquila Urbis, Walldorf 2018, ISBN 978-1724391384.
