= Jiaolong (disambiguation) =

Jiaolong is a dragon in Chinese mythology.

Jiaolong may also refer to:

- Jiaolong (submersible), Chinese crewed deep-sea research submersible
- Jiaolong (album), 2012 album by Daniel Snaith
- Jiao Lung Waterfall or Jiaolong Waterfall, tallest measured waterfall in Taiwan
- Jiaolong is a private city in Sichuan, China
- 7th Marine Brigade, more often known as "Jiaolong Commandos", the special operations unit of the PLANMC
