= Roatán Marine Park =

Coordinates: 16.30508°N 86.59344°W

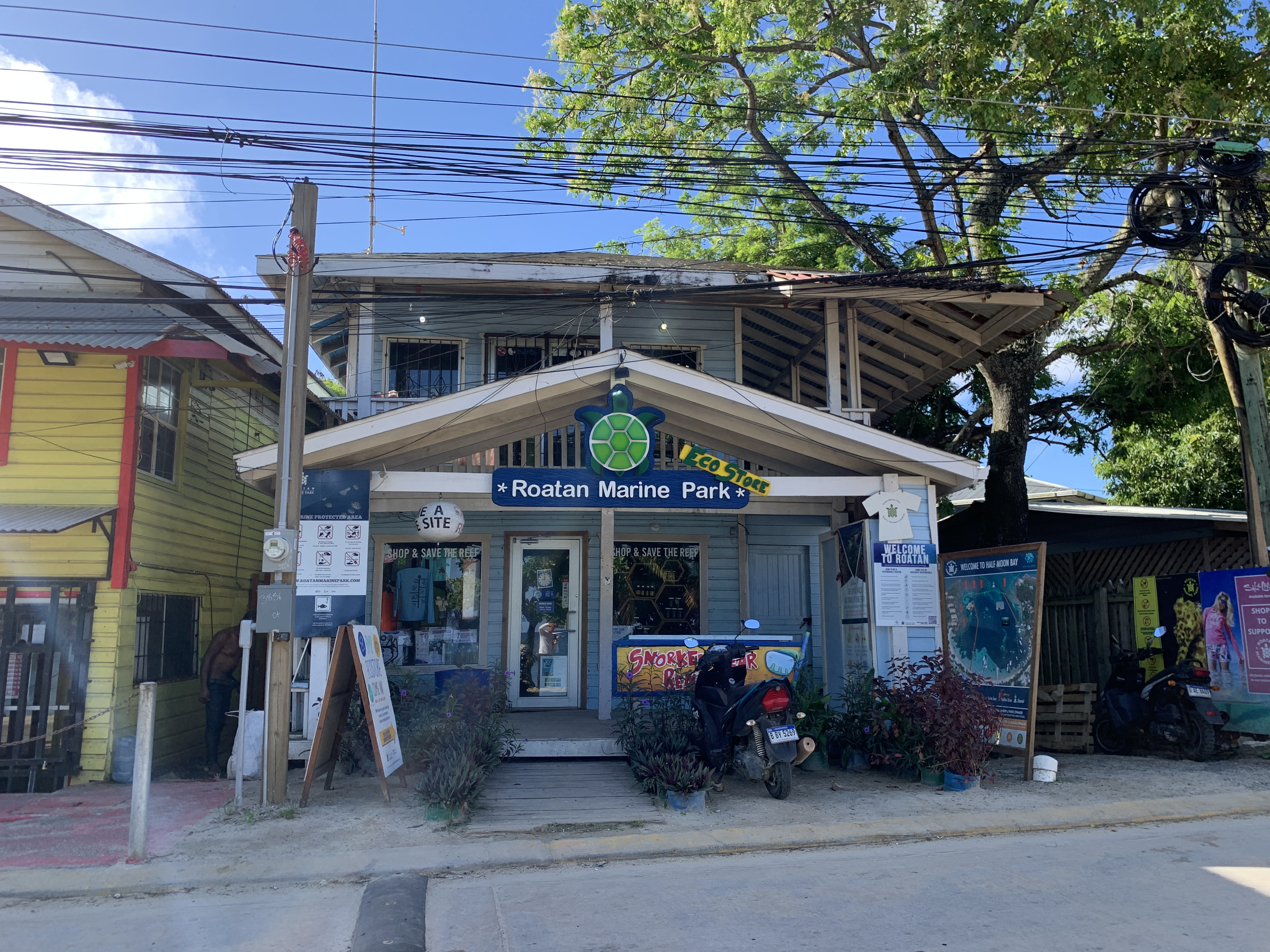
Roatán Marine Park

The Roatán Marine Park (RMP), based in Roatán, Honduras, is a grass roots, community-based, non-profit organization, non governmental organisation (NGO) established in January 2005 by a group of dive operators and local businesses that were concerned about the alarming rate of reef degradation in the Sandy Bay-West End Marine Reserve (SBWEMR). With a rapidly developing island, the number of challenges the RMP faces increases daily. The founding board of directors William Welbourn, Gaynor Pook, Jennifer Keck, Alvin Jackson and Mish Akel were elected in 2005.
