= Zone for Employment and Economic Development =

Hondoras Governmental Administrative system

Zone for Employment and Economic Development (Spanish: Zona de empleo y desarrollo económico, or ZEDE, colloquially called a model city) is the proposal for a type of administrative division in Honduras that provides a high level of autonomy, with its own political system at a judicial, economic, and administrative level, while still subject to the Honduras government. In 2024, the Honduran Supreme Court declared the proposal to be unconstitutional.

== History ==
The origin of the ZEDEs was in the controversial government of Porfirio Lobo Sosa, who came to power during the ousting of his predecessor during 2009 Honduran constitutional crisis, and was furthered by the ensuing Juan Orlando Hernández administration. Both left office marred by corruption allegations and high unpopularity.

The first attempt to create what later became known as ZEDEs, the REDs (Regiones Especiales de Desarrollo or Special Development Regions) was struck down as unconstitutional in October 2012 by the Supreme Court of Honduras. In September 2013, after replacing 4 supreme court justices in December 2012, and amending the constitution, the law to create ZEDEs was passed.

The concept of a ZEDE was criticized by many in Honduras, including the United Nations Office of the High Commission for Human Rights in Honduras, as an attack on the nation's sovereignty and its citizens constitutional rights. In 2022, Honduran president Xiomara Castro signed a measure to repeal the 2013 legislation. However, despite their controversial origin in discredited and unpopular administrations, these ZEDEs were created within a framework of 50 year sunset clauses and internationally binding agreements, aimed to make them functionally unrepealable, in an effort to place these economic zones beyond the jurisdiction of Honduran democracy. ZEDEs such as Próspera have claimed they are "Built to Last", have threatened the Honduran government with an $11 billion dollar liability if their development is halted, and written to the US State Department requesting that the US "encourage" Honduras to respect these 50 year arrangements.

In September 2024, the Honduran Supreme Court declared zones for employment and economic development unconstitutional.

== Objectives ==
Cities were planned to be created to attract investment in currently uninhabited parts of the country, or in municipalities that agree to be converted into ZEDE zones. Every zone was to be governed by a technical secretary, elected by a committee appointed by the president of Honduras. ZEDEs were inspired by free trade zones in China (Hong Kong, Macao, Shenzhen, Shanghai), South Korea (IFEZ), Singapore and in part the

Free Private City model.

ZEDE has the following objectives for economic development:

1. International logistics centres that permit the processing of goods at a grand scale (such as the Colón Free Trade Zone in Panamá).
2. International business courts that resolve disputes between both national and foreign business entities (such as the Isle of Man, United Kingdom).
3. Special investment districts that permit the creation of centres for the service sector (such as the Cayman Enterprise City, Cayman Islands).
4. Districts for renewable energy that permit investment in renewable energy (such as the solar parks in Arizona, United States).
5. Special economic zones in which the laws that govern the economy will be different from the rest of the country. National laws might be suspended in favor of solutions based on a free market. Compare Shenzhen, China.
6. Zones subject to a special judicial system that function under a judicial tradition different from the usual (such as the courts in the financial districts of Dubai that are subject to Common Law).
7. Special agro-industrial zones that permit incentives for exporting high-quality agricultural products (such as the cultivation of asparagus in Peru).
8. Special tourist zones that permit special conditions for creating centres for tourism in undeveloped parts of the country.

== Projected impact ==
Economists at the Universidad Francisco Marroquín conducted an economic impact analysis examining how ZEDEs might impact the Honduran economy. They found that a ZEDE which resembles the growth rates of China's Special Economic Zones would reach $36,000 GDP per capita by 2050, but such claims are widely disputed.

== Current ZEDEs ==
- Próspera, Technology and Services ZEDE. It is located next to the village of Crawfish Rock on the island of Roatan. Prospera's Laws allow for expansion along coastal Honduras. On March 18, 2021 they confirmed the addition of an area near the Satuye area of La Ceiba, labeled as "Port Satuye".
- Ciudad Morazán, Low Income Manufacturing (Maquila) Employee Community and Industrial Zone. It is located near the city of Choloma in the Department of Cortes. Phase 1 of the development will entail in a gated low-income housing project. Phase 2 will create manufacturing areas within the gated community.
- ZEDE Orquídea, in Choluteca, for the agricultural industry with the parent company Agroalpha. It is located at Las Tapias in the municipality of San Marcos de Colón. Agroalpha will construct a large greenhouse for cultivation of produce for foreign exports. ZEDE Orquídea has adopted the common law of the State of Delaware as its applicable private law.

In April 2022, the Honduran Congress repealed the constitutional amendments and laws that created the ZEDE regime. However, the three existing ZEDE are grandfathered in for a period of 50 years, as per their Legal Stability Agreements, Article 45 of the ZEDE Organic Law, and the Bilateral Investment Treaty with the Government of Kuwait.

== Potential candidates and failed ZEDEs ==
- Unnamed Peña Blanca ZEDE – Originally proposed as the first ZEDE with a focus in the agricultural sector. Peña Blanca was selected for its location near the agricultural and manufacturing region of Valle de Sula. The project ultimately failed to receive local support.
- Unnamed Suyapa ZEDE – Religious tourism ZEDE surrounding Districto Central's Basilica de Suyapa. It failed to receive local support.
- Unnamed Valle ZEDE – Distributed among the three municipalities of Nacaome, Amapala and Alianza. The Valle ZEDE was intended to function as an agricultural and logistics ZEDE, with the department's capital, Nacaome, serving as an agricultural research center, Alianza, on the border with El Salvador, as a logistics free trade zone, and the island city of Amapala as a megaport on the Pacific's Gulf of Fonseca.

== See also ==
- Dubai – economic centre of the United Arab Emirates
- Free Economic Zone of Manaus in the Brazilian Amazon
- Shenzhen – Special Economic Zone (SEZ) in China
