= West Bay, Roatán =

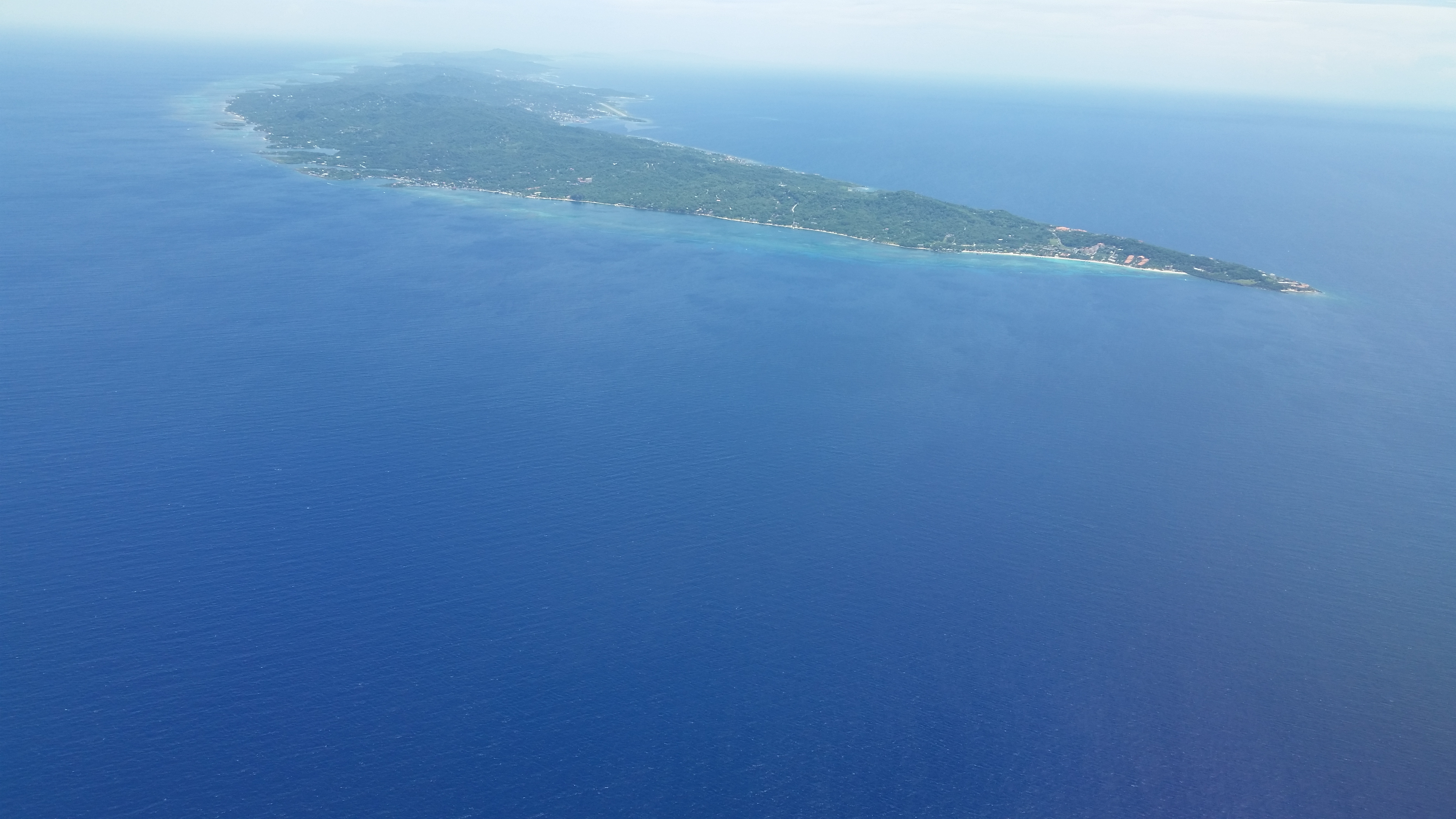

- Location within Honduras
- Coordinates: 16°16′30″N 86°35′58″W
- Type: Bay
- Ocean/sea sources: Caribbean Sea
- Basin countries: Honduras
- Settlements: Roatán

West Bay is a bay in Honduras. It is located in Roatán, the biggest of the Bay Islands of Honduras.

== Description ==
West Bay is located in the west side of Roatan, Honduras, making it part of the biggest Bay Island in Honduras. West bay and West End are often confused by the similarity of their names, but they are two totally different things. West End is a paved road lined with shops and small hotels, while West Bay is a larger area consisting of West Bay Beach.

== Main attractions ==
West Bay beach is a white sand beach and is surrounded by the second largest reef barrier in the world. In October 2011, The Caribbean Travel and Life Magazine made a top 5 of the best beaches in the world for snorkeling in this top 5, the magazine ranked West Bay as the fourth best beach for doing this activity. The Caribbean Travel and Life Magazine said: “Divers adore Roatan. but snorkelers will find plenty to love off this sweet stretch of sand on the island's west coast, courtesy of a vast and thriving reef that's an easy swim from the beach.” In 2016 the tourism page Trip Advisor held an international contest of the 25 best beaches of the world, in which West Bay placed 9th worldwide and 1st place in Central America. CNN in Spanish published this list of beaches as part of their travel section. In 2015, West Bay Beach appeared in 15th place, in a contest considers based on users reviews of beaches.

One of the attractions of West Bay is the boat The Coral Reef Explorer, which allows tourists to view the entire reef via submerged glass windows.

Each May, Roatan’s West Bay Beach hosts an international freediving competition, bringing together the world’s most competitive for the Caribbean Cup. West Bay has taken advantage of the popularity of freediving and has attracted competitors from worldwide. This has led to an increase in Roatan's tourism. The water of West Bay Beach boasts extensive visibility and calm conditions making it ideal for comfortable freediving.
