= Private town =

Town owned by a private person or family

Private towns (Note: Belarusian: прыватныя гарады, Lithuanian: privatūs miestai, Polish: prywatne miasta, Ukrainian: приватні міста.) in the Polish–Lithuanian Commonwealth were privately owned towns within the lands owned by magnates, bishops, knights and princes, among others.

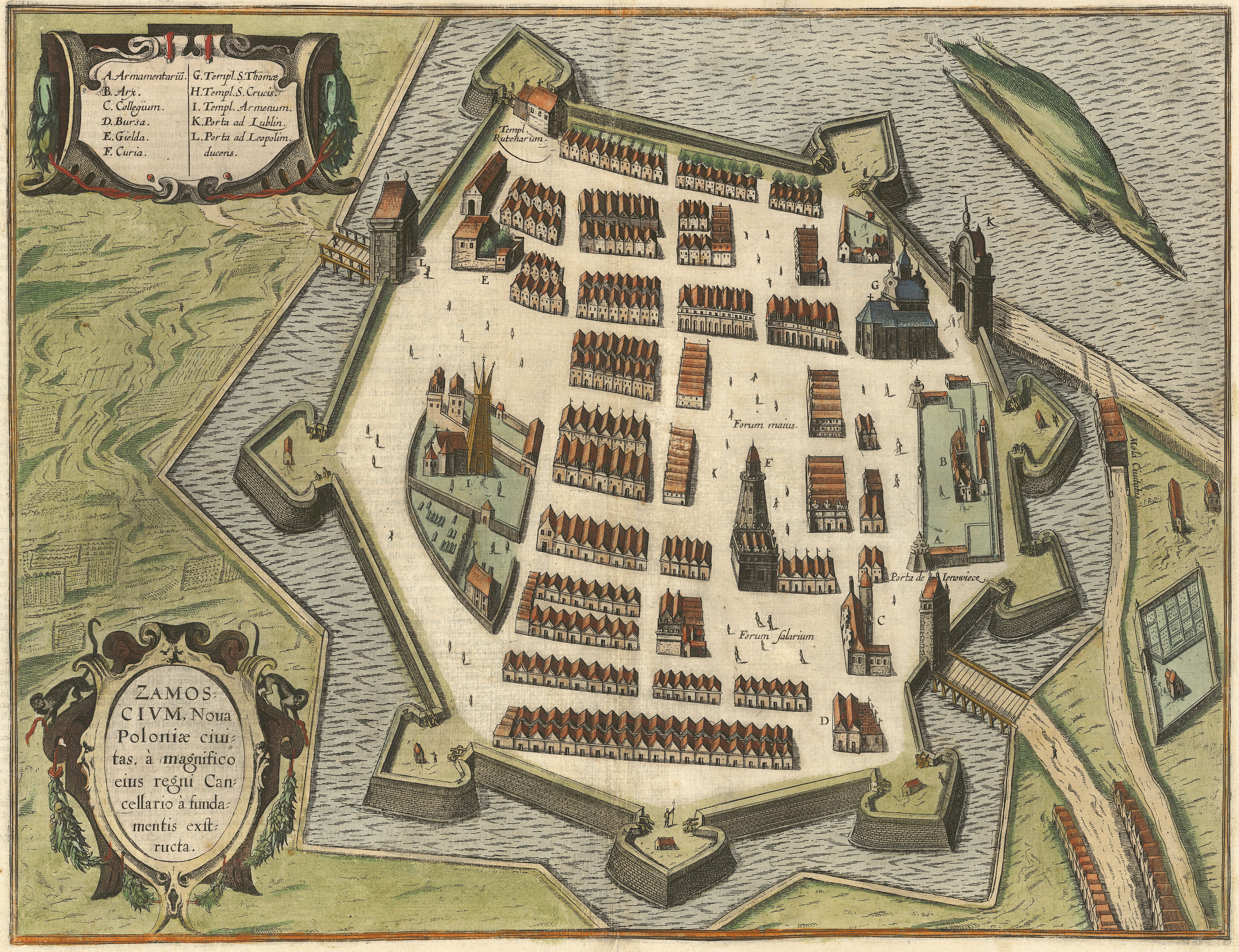
Zamość in the 17th century

Amongst the most well-known former private magnate towns are Białystok, Zamość, Rzeszów, Puławy, Tarnów, Siedlce, Biała Podlaska, Ivano-Frankivsk (Stanisławów), Ternopil (Tarnopol) and Uman (Humań). Magnate palaces and castles can be often found in former private magnate towns. Examples include the Branicki Palace in Białystok; the Czartoryski Palace in Puławy; the Zamoyski Palace in Zamość; the Lubomirski Castle in Rzeszów; the Radziwiłł Palace in Biała Podlaska; the Ogiński Palace in Siedlce; the Potocki Palaces in Międzyrzec Podlaski, Tulchyn and Vysokaye; the Wiśniowiecki Palace in Vyshnivets; and the Zbaraski Castle in Zbarazh.

Also various other landmarks were often founded by the owners, including town halls, churches, monasteries, schools and theatres, some rather unique, like the Mannerist Kalwaria Zebrzydowska Park and Baroque fortified Berdychiv Carmelite Monastery.

Some of the most known former private bishop towns include Łódź, Kielce, Łowicz, Pabianice and Skierniewice.

== List of private towns ==
	City	Population (2015)	Former owners	Country	Administrative division
1.	Białystok	295,282	House of Branicki (Gryf)	Poland	Podlaskie Voivodeship
2.	Poltava (Połtawa)	294,962	House of Wiśniowiecki, House of Koniecpolski	Ukraine	Poltava Oblast
3.	Rivne (Równe)	249,639	House of Ostrogski, House of Lubomirski	Ukraine	Rivne Oblast
4.	Ivano-Frankivsk (Stanisławów)	228,575	House of Potocki	Ukraine	Ivano-Frankivsk Oblast
5.	Ternopil (Tarnopol)	217,773	House of Tarnowski, House of Ostrogski, House of Zamoyski	Ukraine	Ternopil Oblast
6.	Rzeszów	183,108	House of Lubomirski	Poland	Podkarpackie Voivodeship
7.	Tarnów	112,120	House of Tarnowski	Poland	Lesser Poland Voivodeship
8.	Maladzyechna (Mołodeczno)	94,686	House of Sapieha, House of Gosiewski, House of Ogiński	Belarus	Minsk Region
9.	Uman (Humań)	86,451	House of Potocki	Ukraine	Cherkasy Oblast
10.	Berdychiv (Berdyczów)	77,788	House of Tyszkiewicz, House of Zawisza, House of Radziwiłł	Ukraine	Zhytomyr Oblast
11.	Siedlce	76,347	House of Ogiński	Poland	Masovian Voivodeship
12.	Zhlobin (Żłobin)	75,700	House of Chodkiewicz Bona Sforza	Belarus	Gomel Region
13.	Ostrów Wielkopolski	72,890	House of Przebendowski	Poland	Greater Poland Voivodeship
14.	Ostrowiec Świętokrzyski	72,277	House of Tarnowski	Poland	Świętokrzyskie Voivodeship
15.	Smila (Smiła)	68,618	House of Lubomirski	Ukraine	Cherkasy Oblast
16.	Chervonohrad (Krystynopol)	67,863	House of Potocki	Ukraine	Lviv Oblast
17.	Kalush (Kałusz)	67,631	House of Sieniawski	Ukraine	Ivano-Frankivsk Oblast
18.	Zamość	65,255	House of Zamoyski	Poland	Lublin Voivodeship
19.	Leszno	64,589	House of Leszczyński, House of Sułkowski	Poland	Greater Poland Voivodeship
20.	Zhodzina (Żodzino)	63,722	House of Radziwiłł	Belarus	Minsk Region

=== Private clergy towns ===
Former private clergy towns by population as of 2015:

	City	Population (2015)	Former owners	Country (2023)	Administrative division (2023)
1.	Łódź	711,332	Diocese of Kujawy	Poland	Łódź Voivodeship
2.	Kielce	199,870	Diocese of Kraków	Poland	Świętokrzyskie Voivodeship
3.	Olsztyn	174,675	Diocese of Warmia	Poland	Warmian-Masurian Voivodeship
4.	Włocławek	114,885	Diocese of Kujawy	Poland	Kuyavian-Pomeranian Voivodeship
5.	Suwałki	69,317	Camaldolese	Poland	Podlaskie Voivodeship
6.	Pabianice	67,688	Diocese of Kraków	Poland	Łódź Voivodeship
7.	Skierniewice	48,634	Archdiocese of Gniezno	Poland	Łódź Voivodeship
8.	Fastiv (Fastów)	47,869	Diocese of Kyiv	Ukraine	Kyiv Oblast
9.	Marijampolė (Mariampol)	38,345	Marians	Lithuania	Marijampolė County
10.	Czeladź	32,940	Diocese of Kraków	Poland	Silesian Voivodeship

== Gallery ==
World Heritage Sites in former private towns of the Polish-Lithuanian Commonwealth

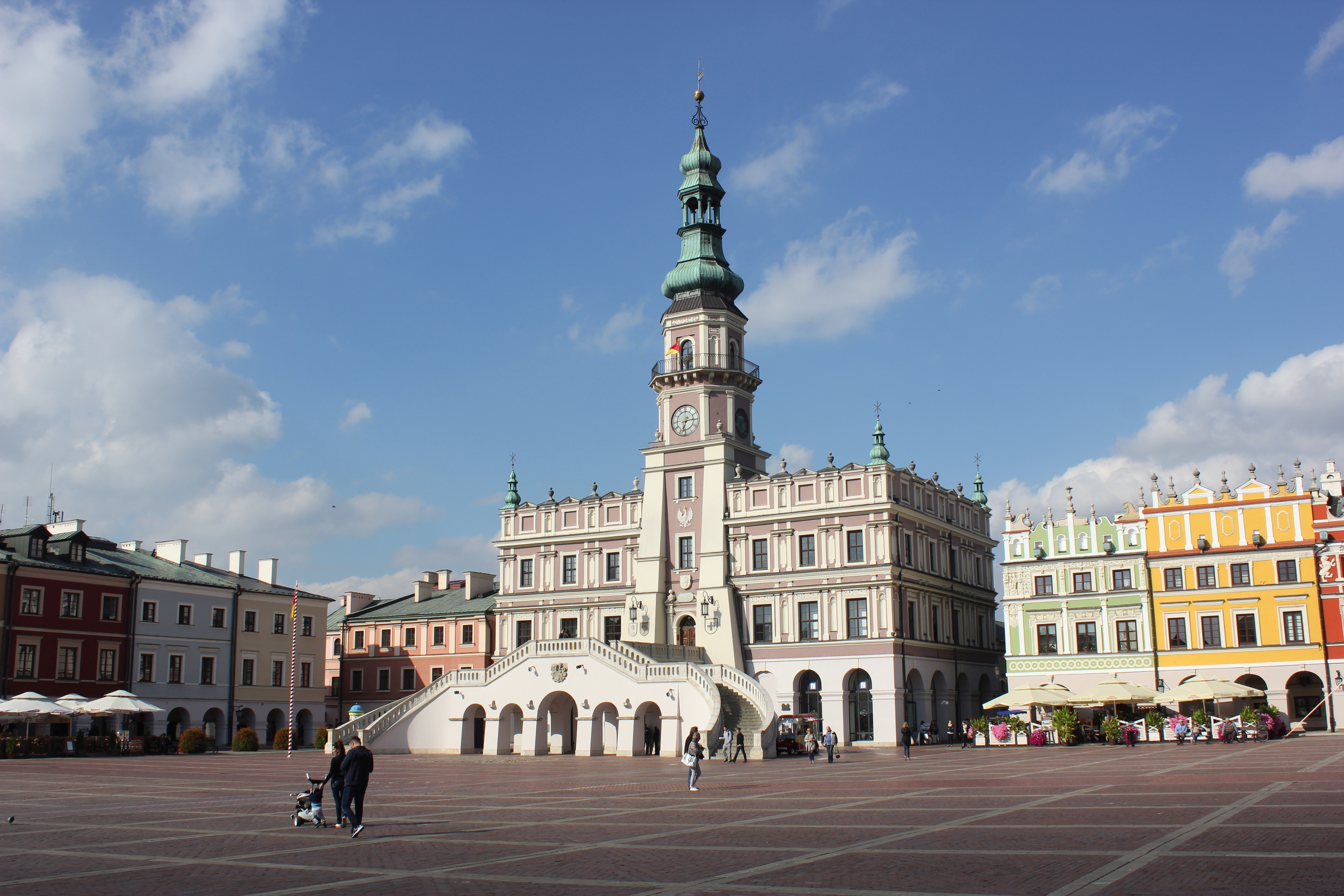
Old City of Zamość

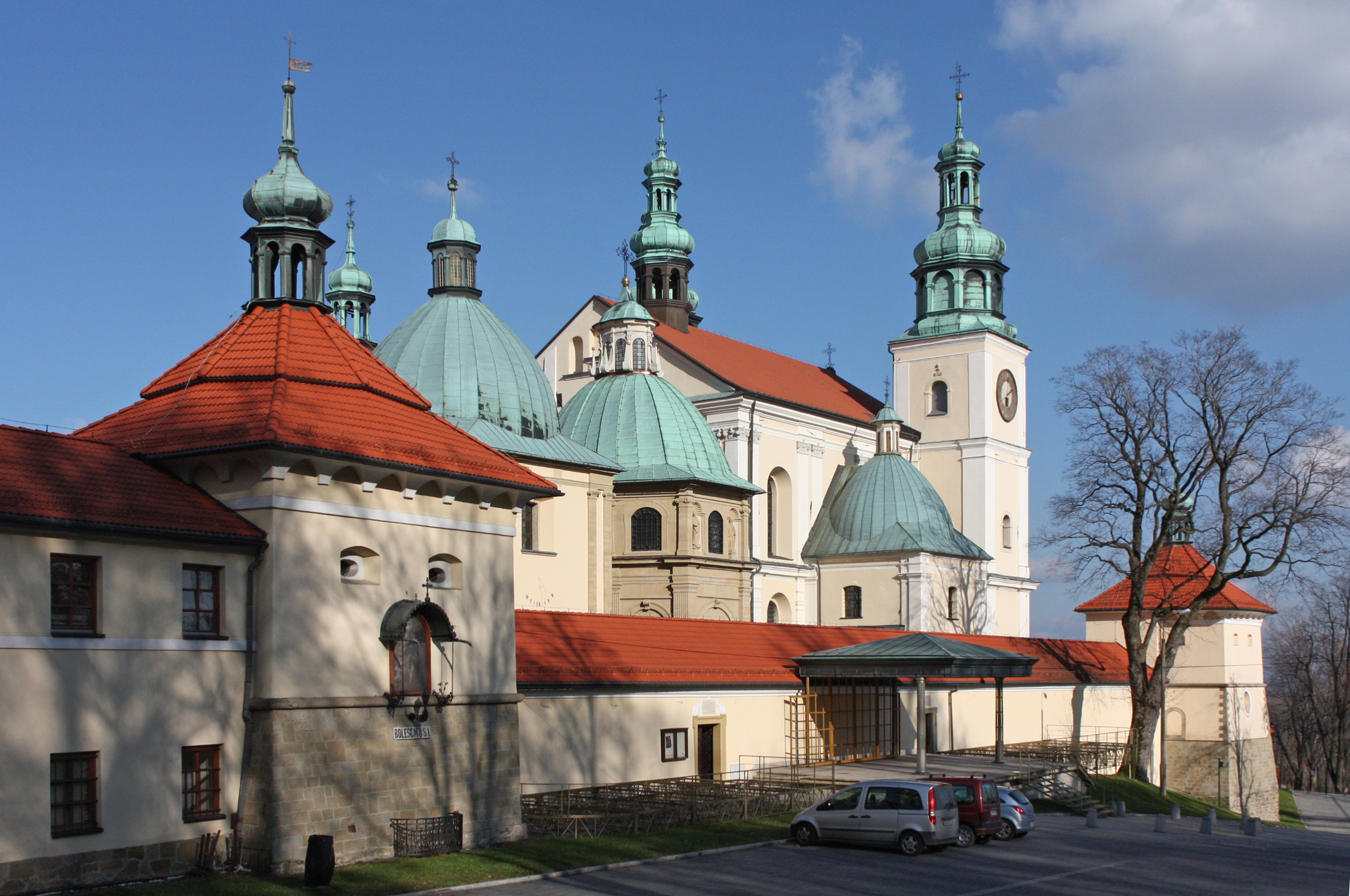
Kalwaria Zebrzydowska park

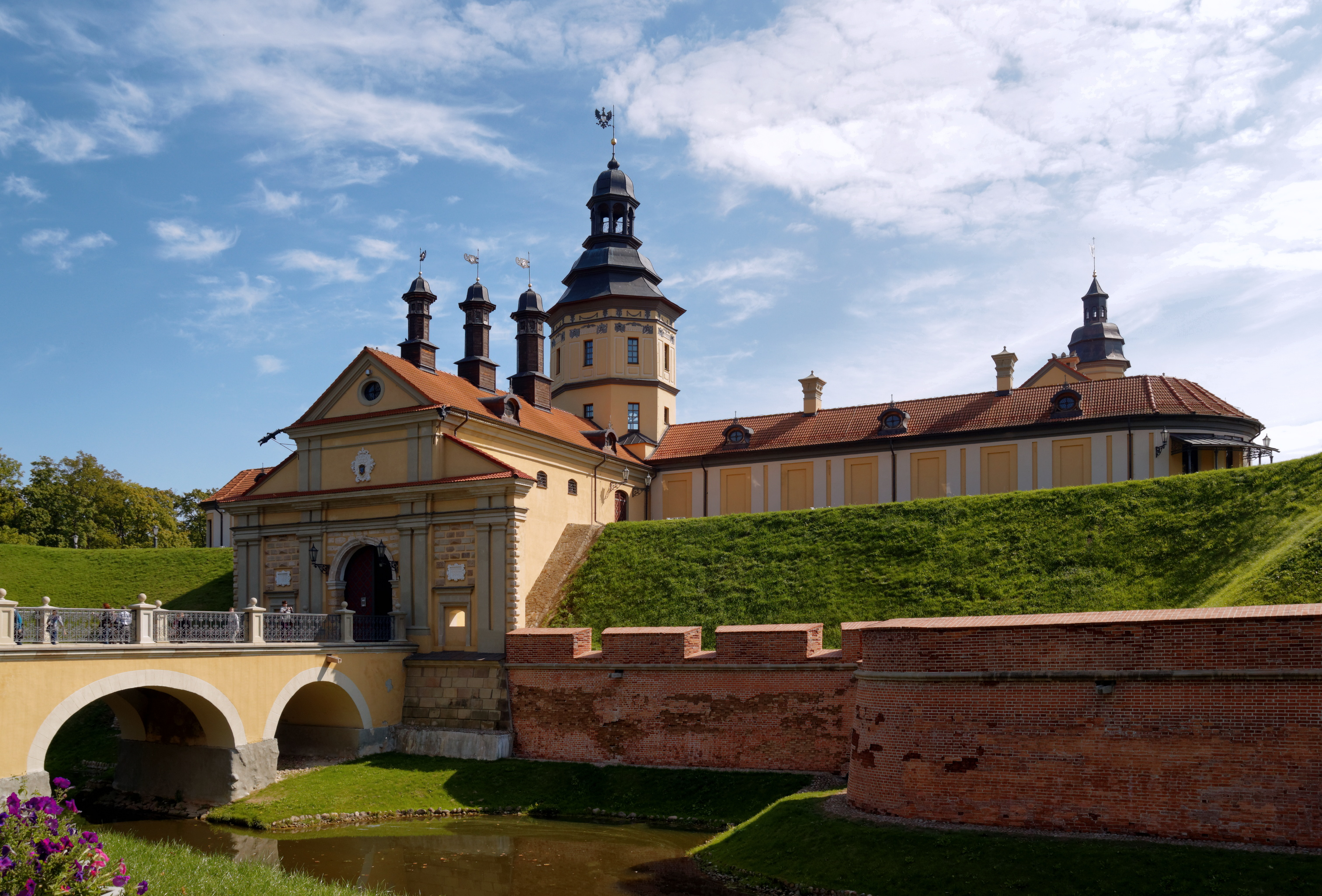
Nesvizh Castle

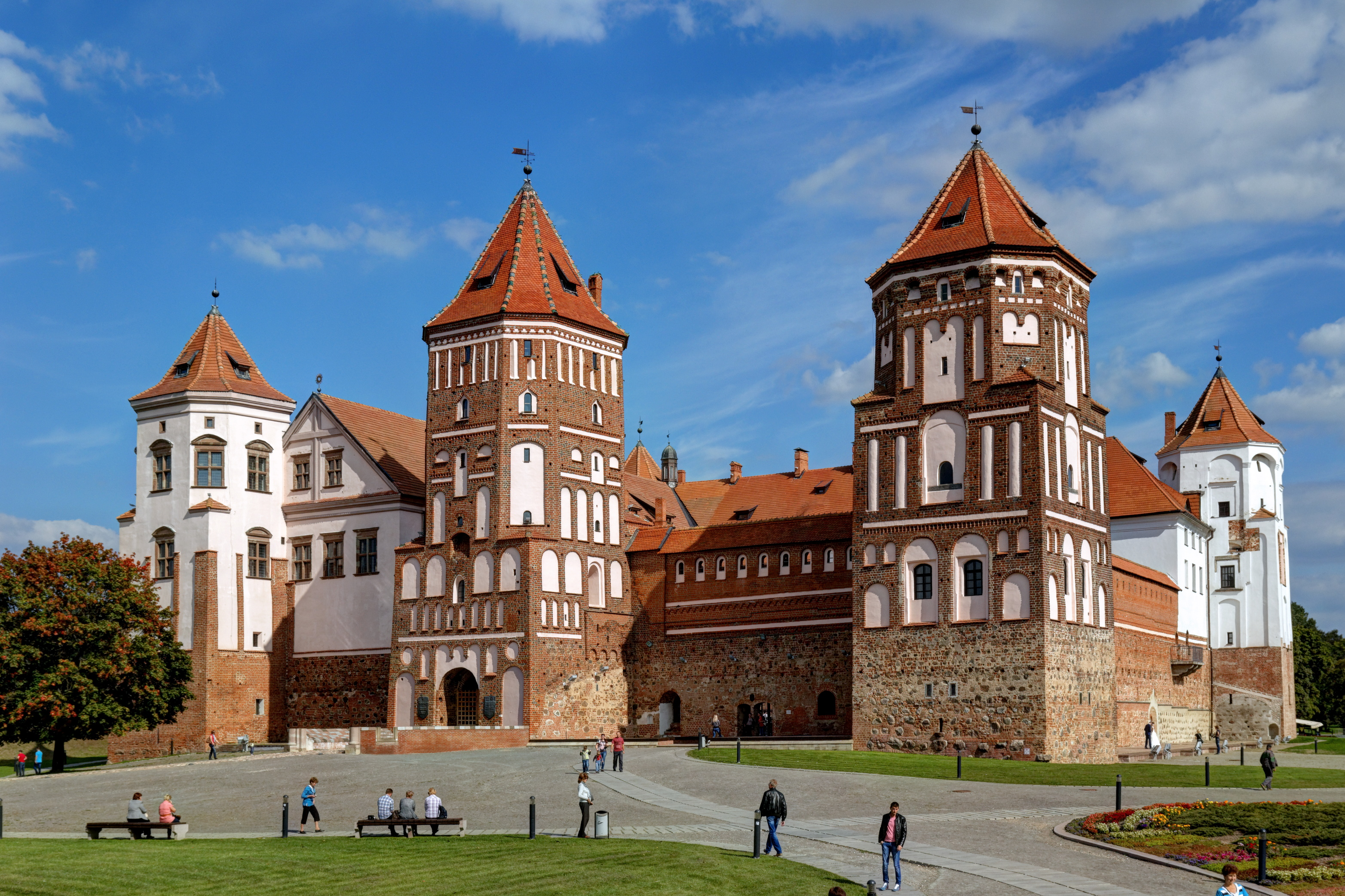
Mir Castle Complex

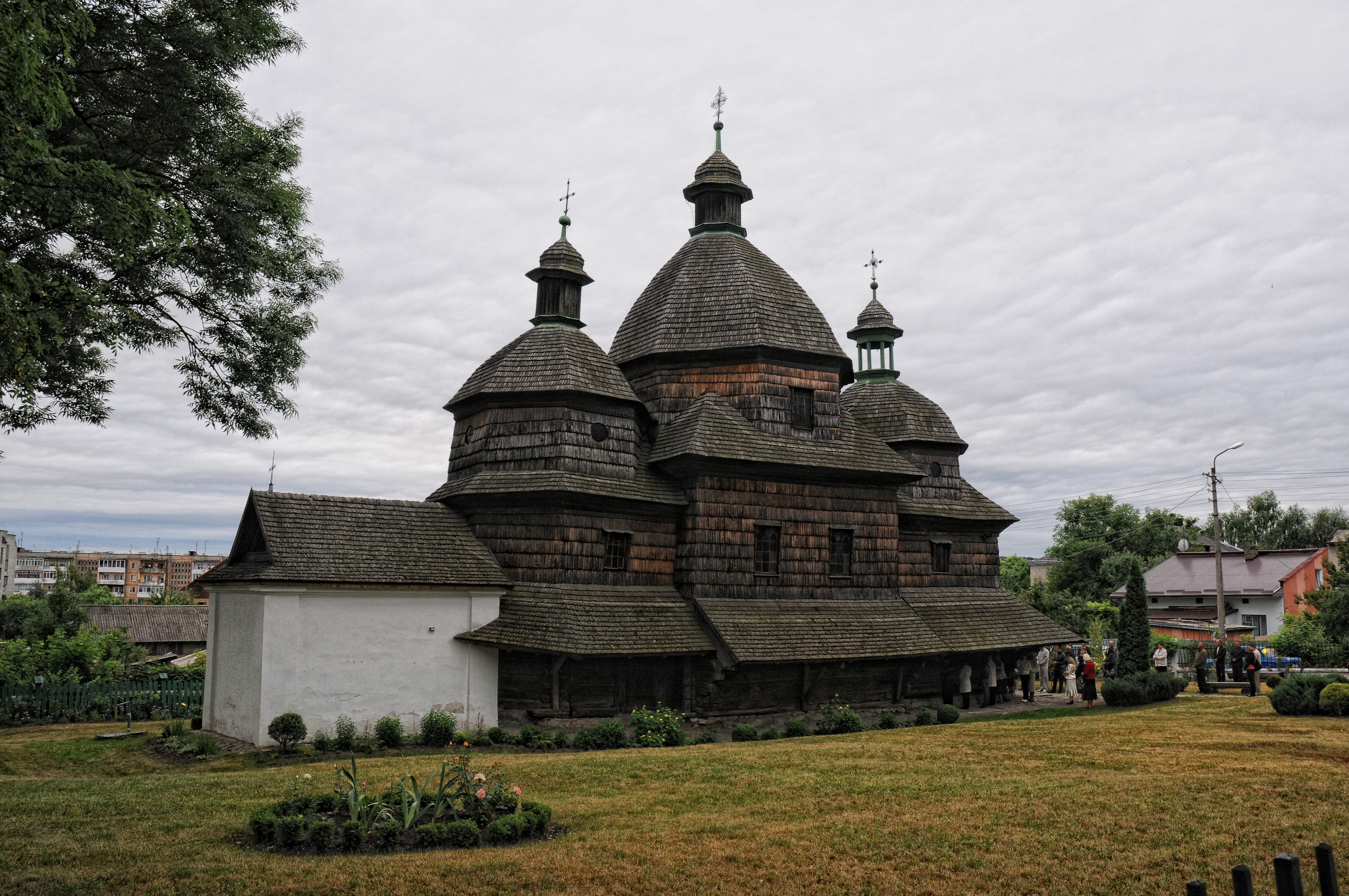
Holy Trinity Church, Zhovkva
Former noble residences in private towns

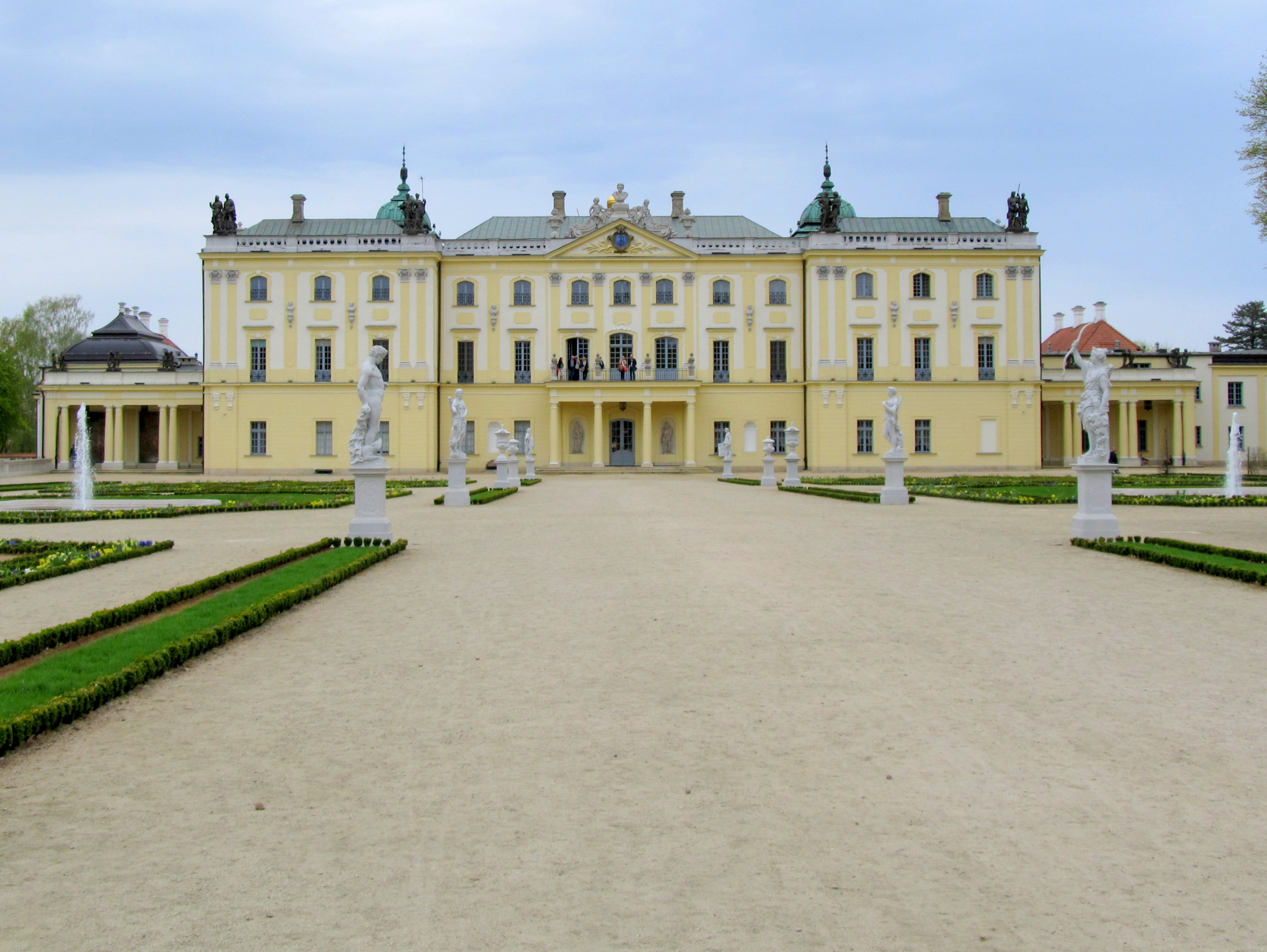
Branicki Palace, Białystok

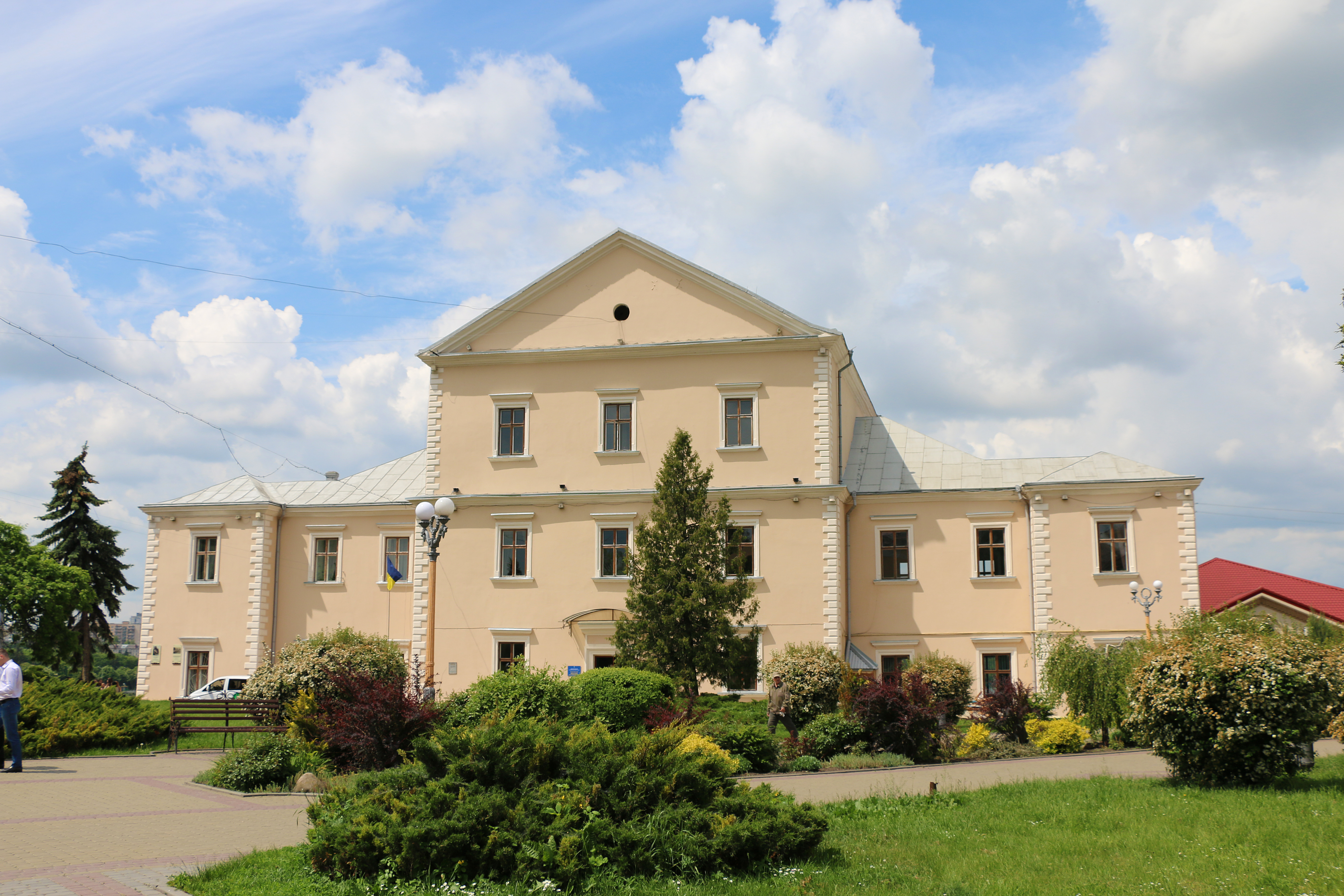
Tarnowski Castle, Ternopil

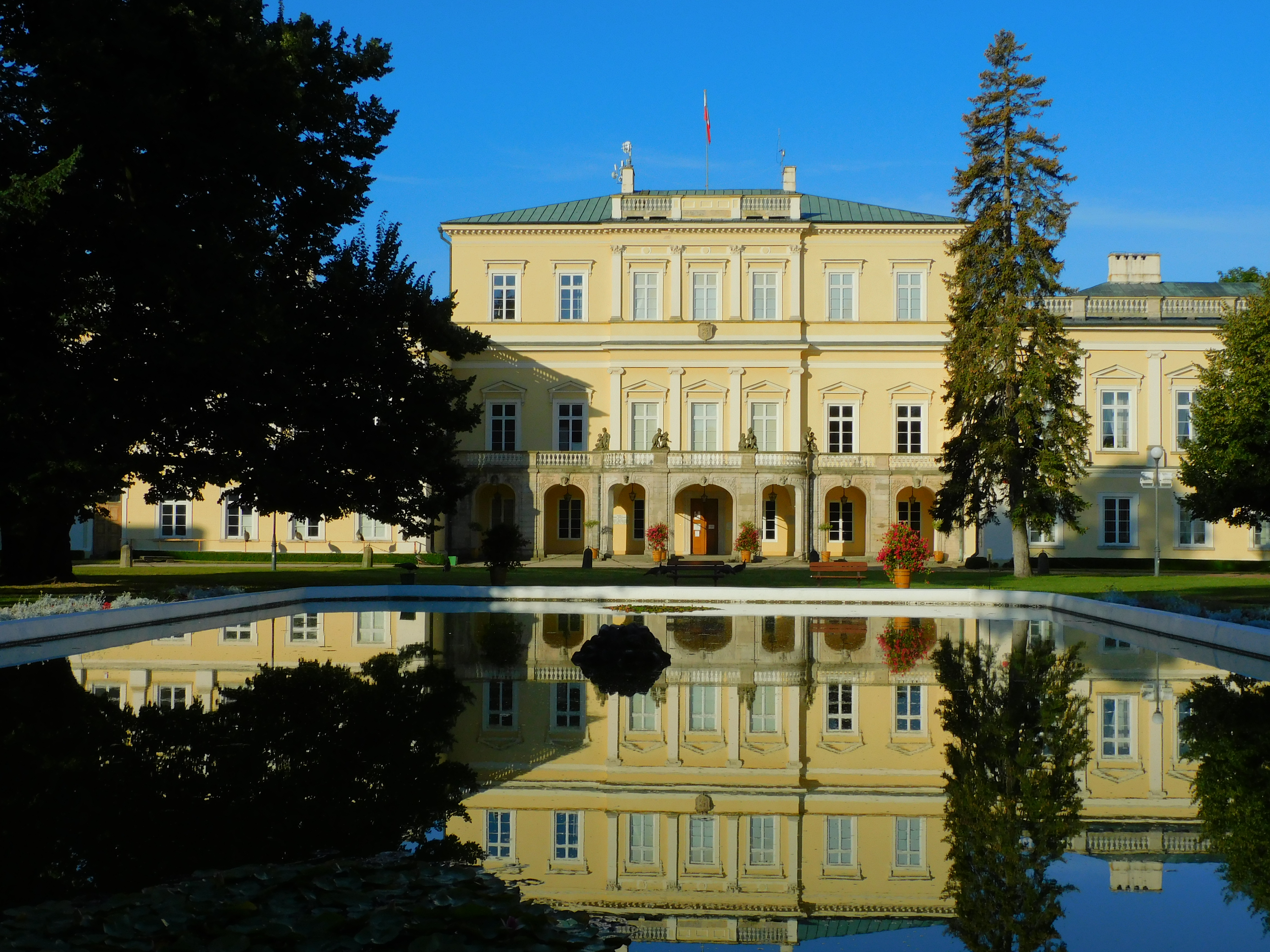
Czartoryski Palace, Puławy

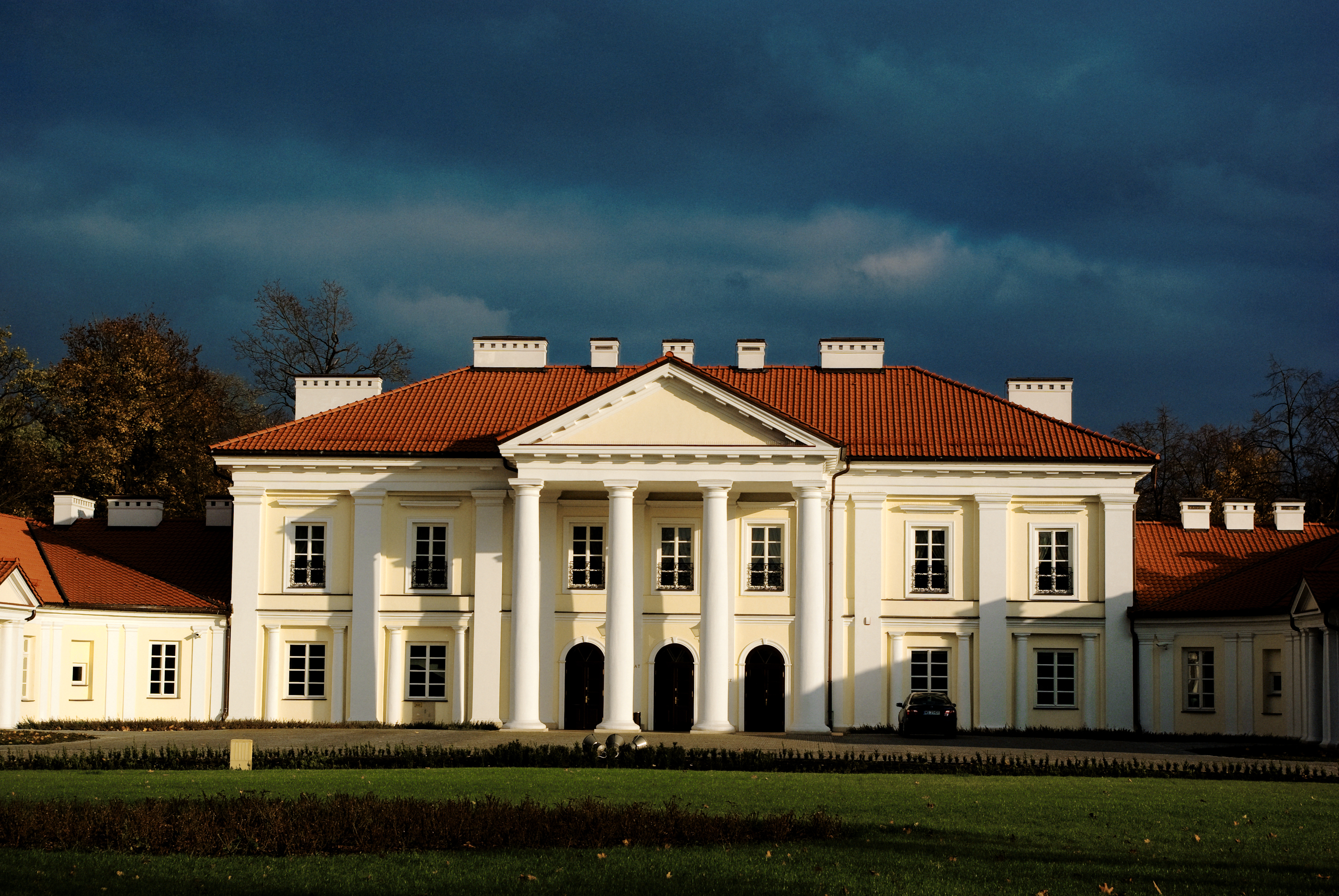
Ogiński Palace, Siedlce

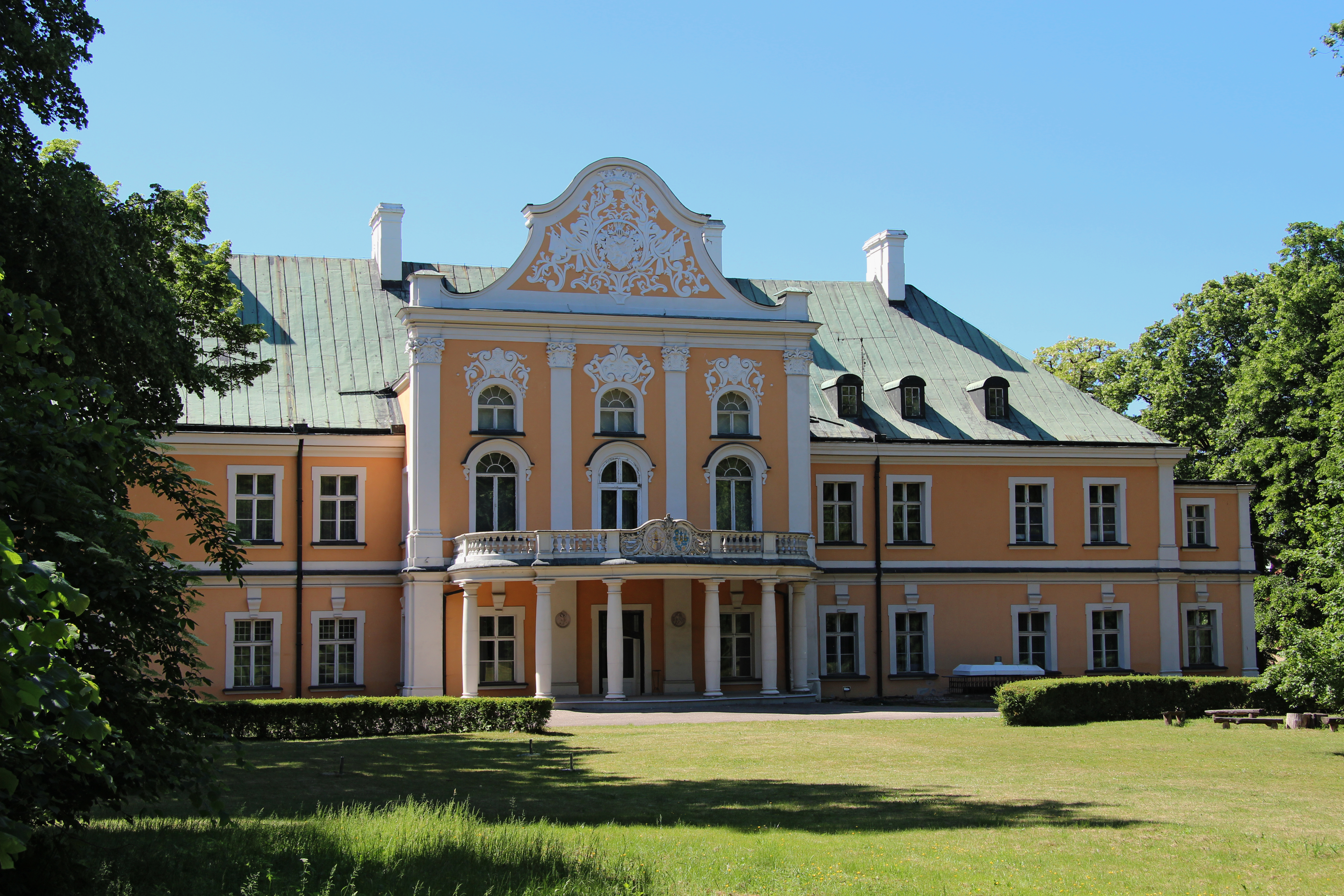
Szołdrski Palace, Czempiń
Former clergy residences in former private clergy towns

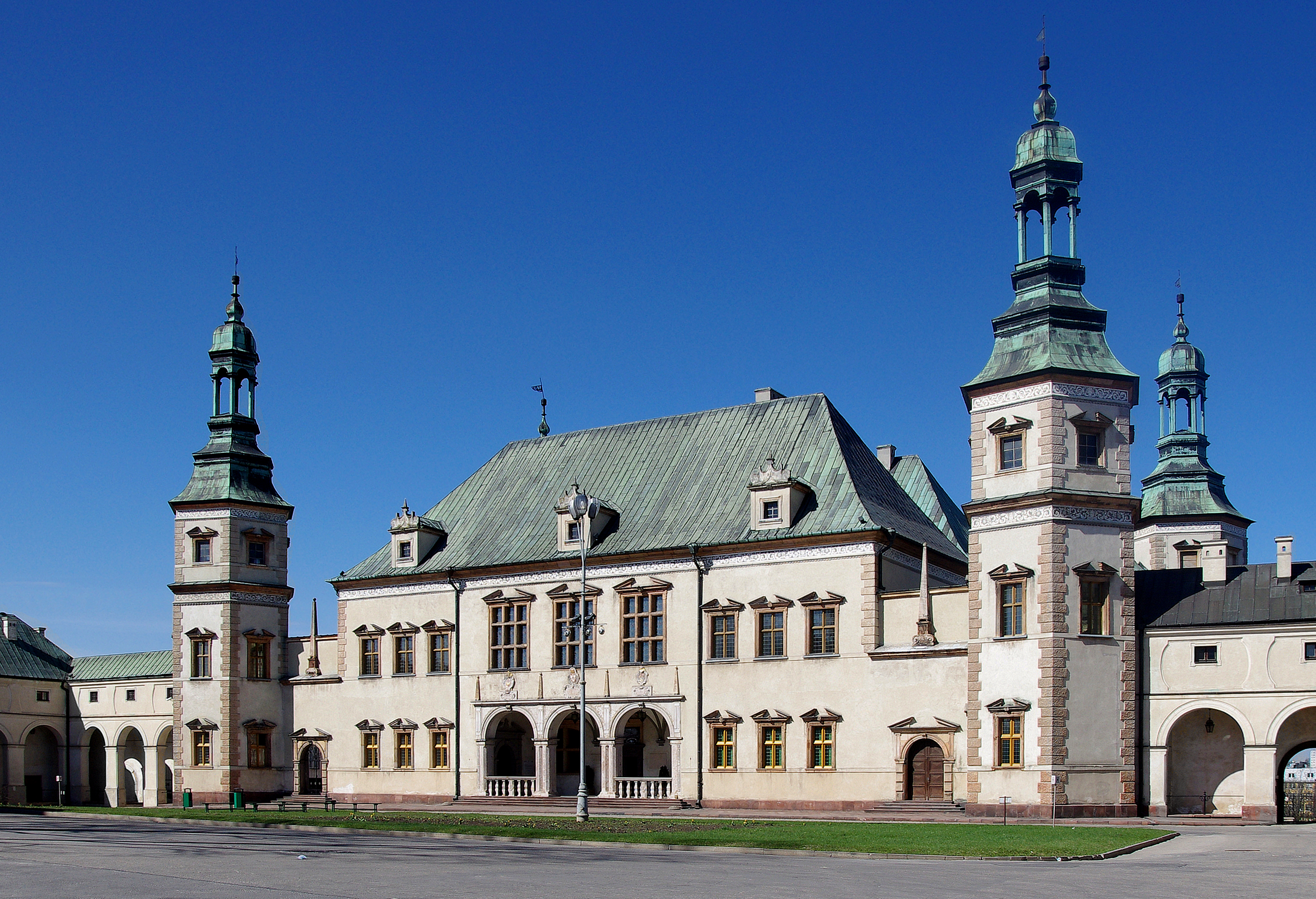
Palace of the Kraków Bishops, Kielce

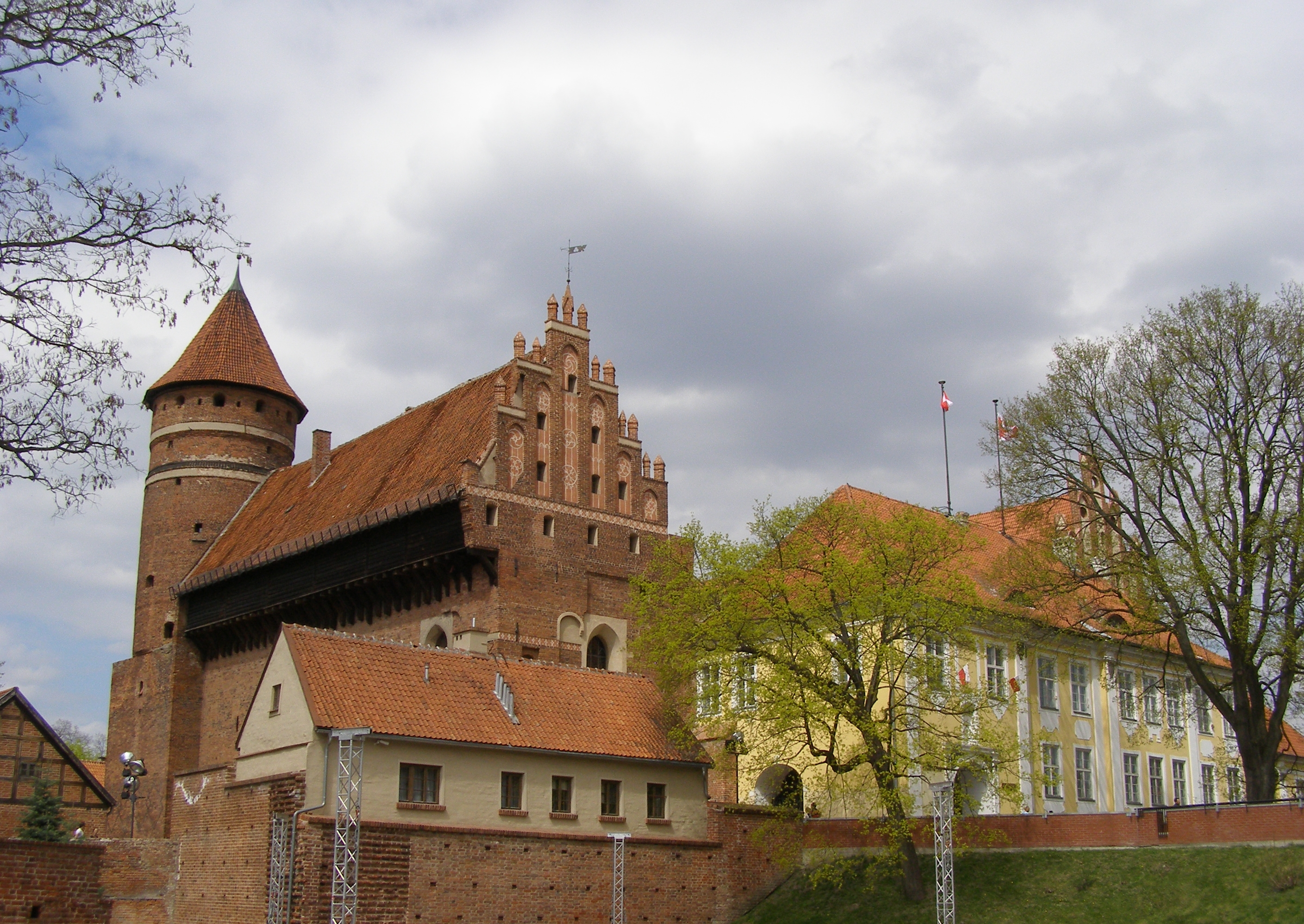
Castle of Warmian Cathedral Chapter, Olsztyn

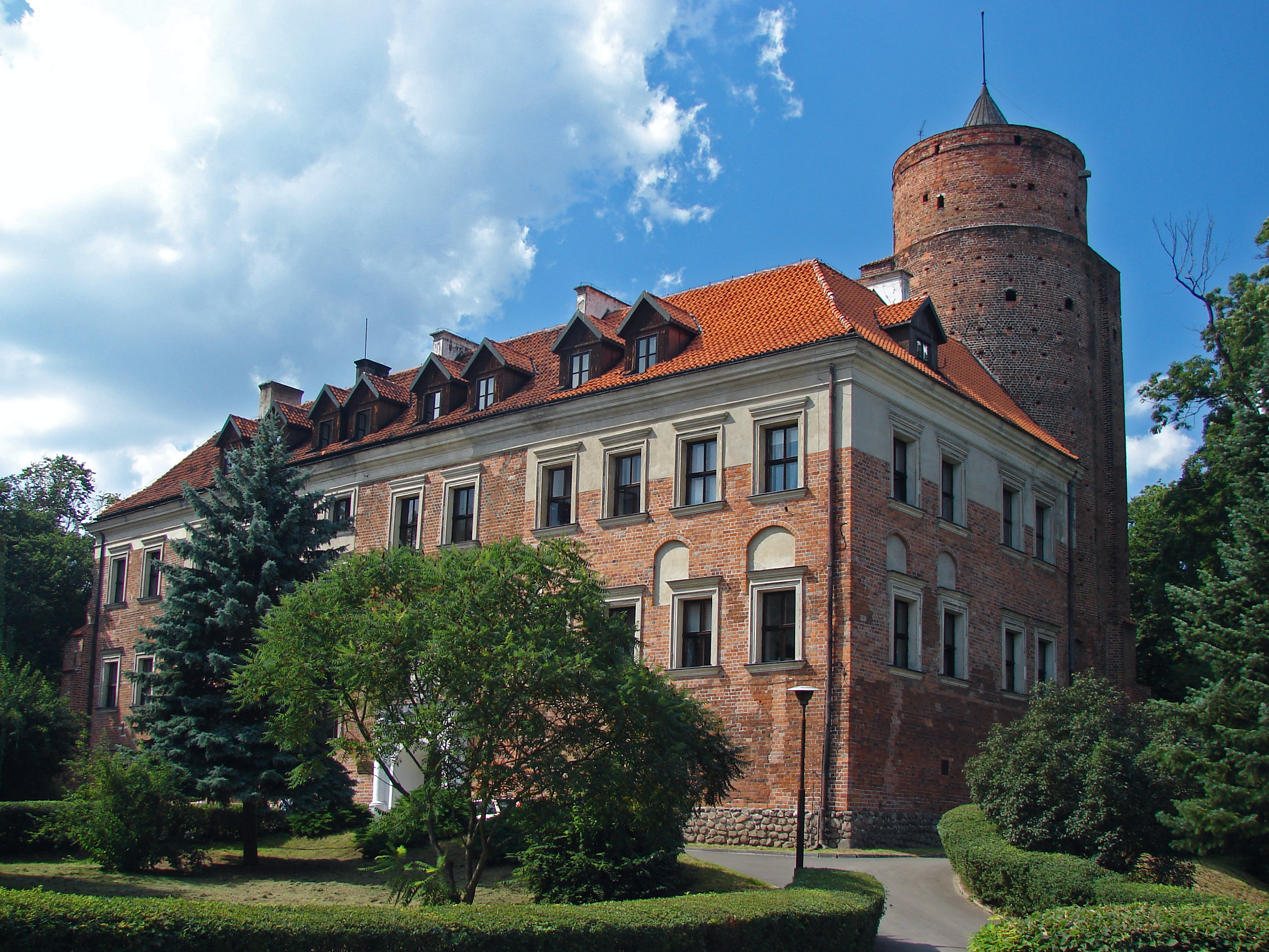
Castle of the Archbishops of Gniezno, Uniejów

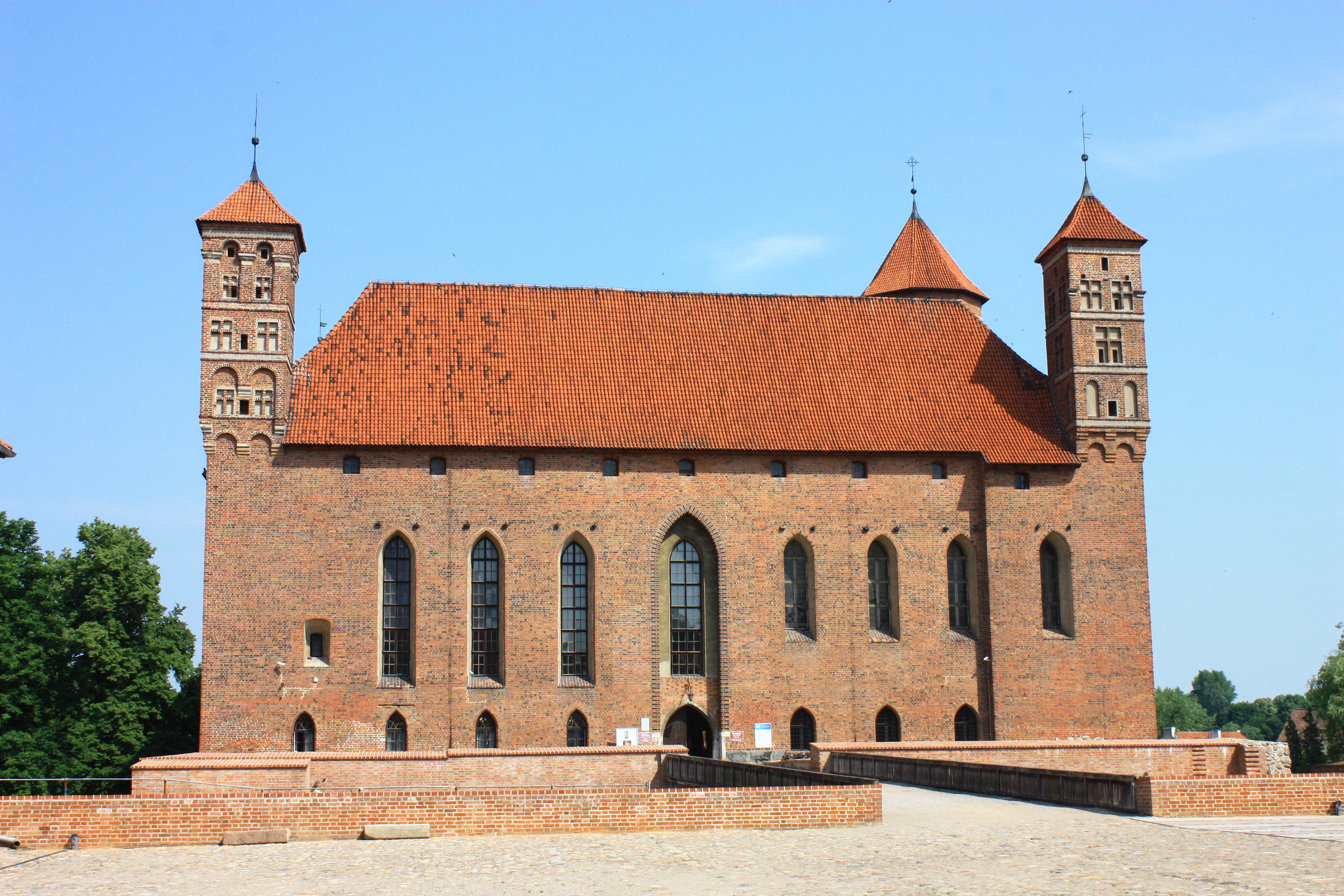
Castle of Warmian Bishops, Lidzbark Warmiński

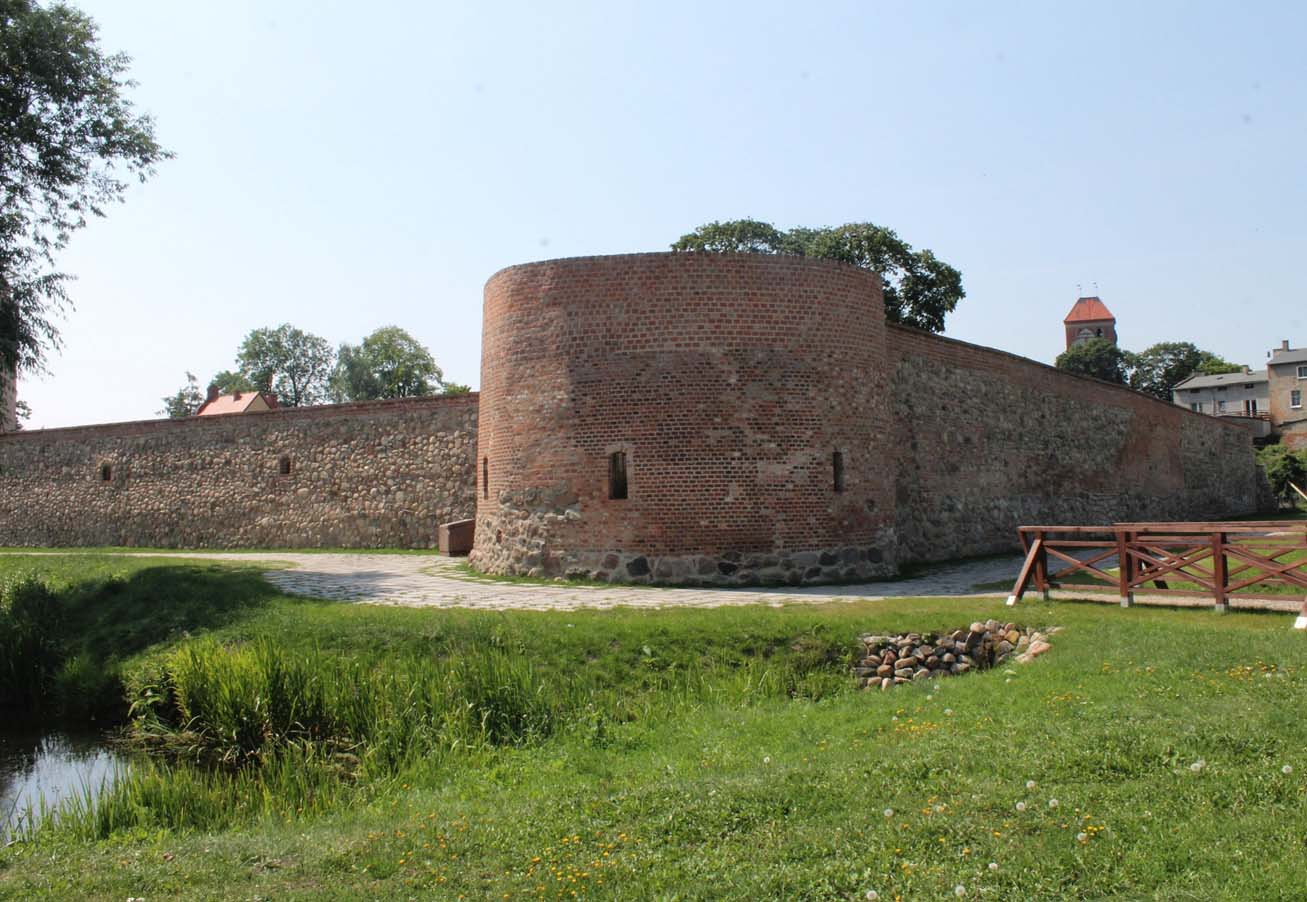
Castle of the Bishops of Chełmno, Lubawa

== See also ==
- Royal city in Polish–Lithuanian Commonwealth
- Company town
- Closed town
- Ghost town
- Private city
