= Roatán =

Largest of the Bay Islands, Honduras

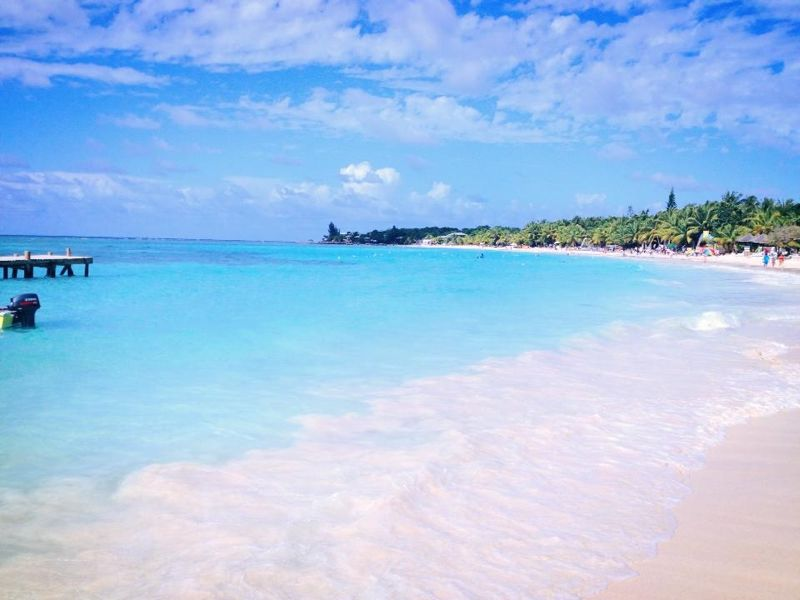
- Roatán, Bay Islands

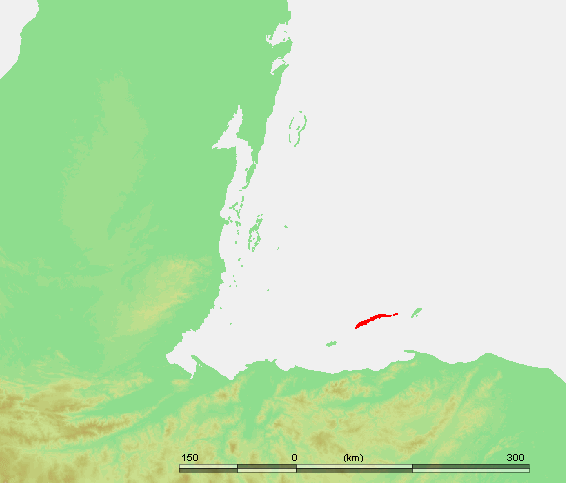
- Location in the Gulf of Honduras

- Location within Honduras Location within the Caribbean

Geography
- Location: Caribbean Sea
- Coordinates: 16°23′N 86°24′W
- Archipelago: Bay Islands
- Total islands: 7
- Major islands: Roatán, Útila and Guanaja
- Area: 83 km^{2} (32 sq mi)
- Length: 59 km (36.7 mi)
- Width: 8 km (5 mi)
- Coastline: 154 km (95.7 mi)
- Highest point: 221 m (725.1 ft)

Administration
- Honduras
- Department: Bay Islands
- Municipality: Islas de la Bahia
- Largest settlement: Coxen Hole (pop. 12,500)
- Mayor: Ronnie Richard McNab

Demographics
- Population: 110,000 (2020)
- Pop. density: 538/km^{2} (1393/sq mi)
- Ethnic groups: Islanders (see Demographics), Kalinago, Taíno, Garifuna

Additional information
- Time zone: Central/Mountain

Roatán (Spanish pronunciation: [ro.aˈtan]) is an island in the Caribbean, about 65 kilometres (40 mi) off the northern coast of Honduras. The largest of the Bay Islands of Honduras, it is located between the islands of Utila and Guanaja. It is approximately 59 kilometres (37 mi) long, and less than 8 kilometres (5.0 mi) across at its widest point. The island consists of two municipalities: José Santos Guardiola in the east and Roatán in the west (the latter includes Cayos Cochinos, pair of small islands halfway to the mainland). The special economic zone of Próspera is also on the west side. The island was formerly known in English as Ruatan and Rattan.

== Geography ==
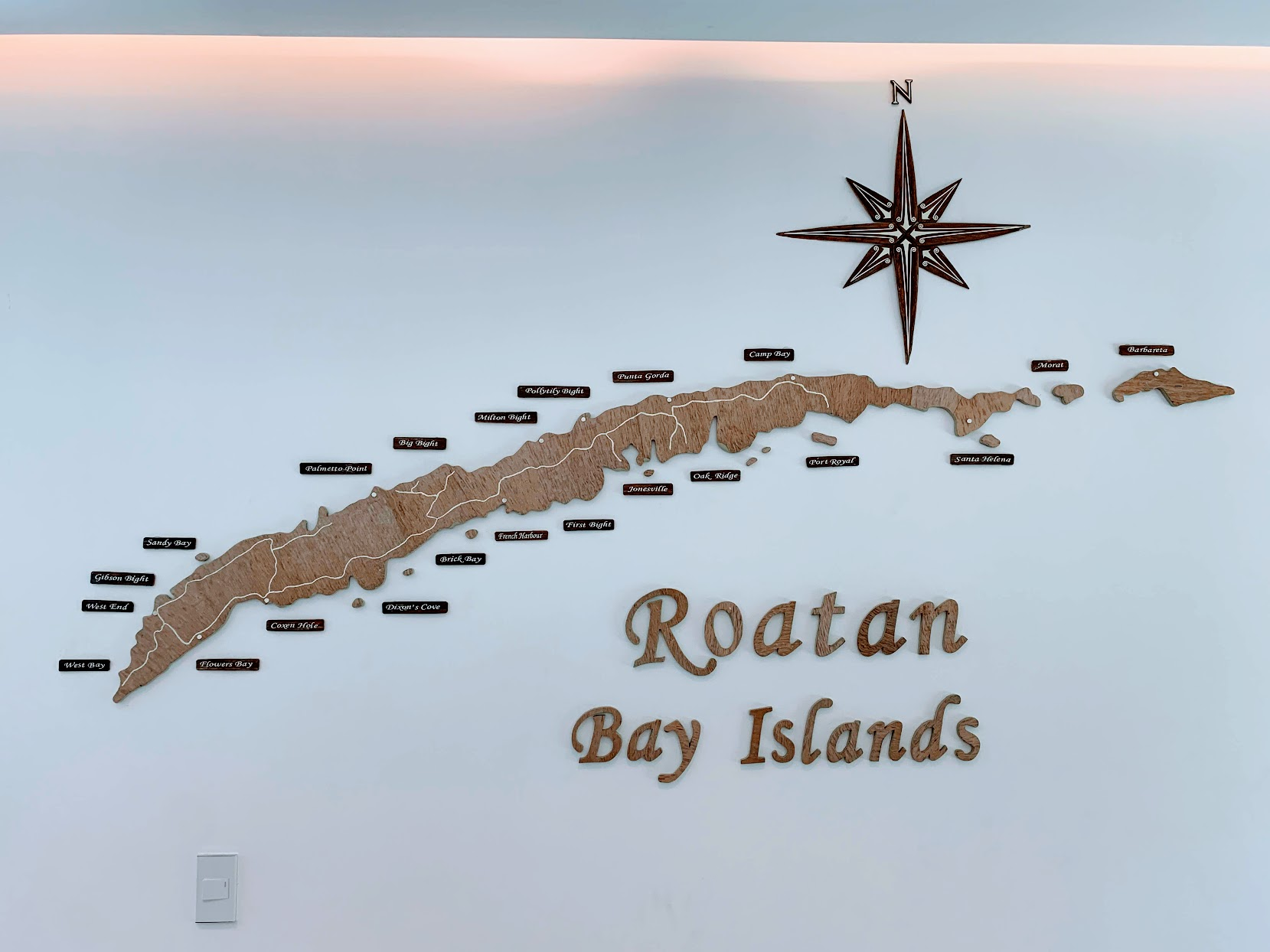
Roatan Bay Islands from hotel lobby display

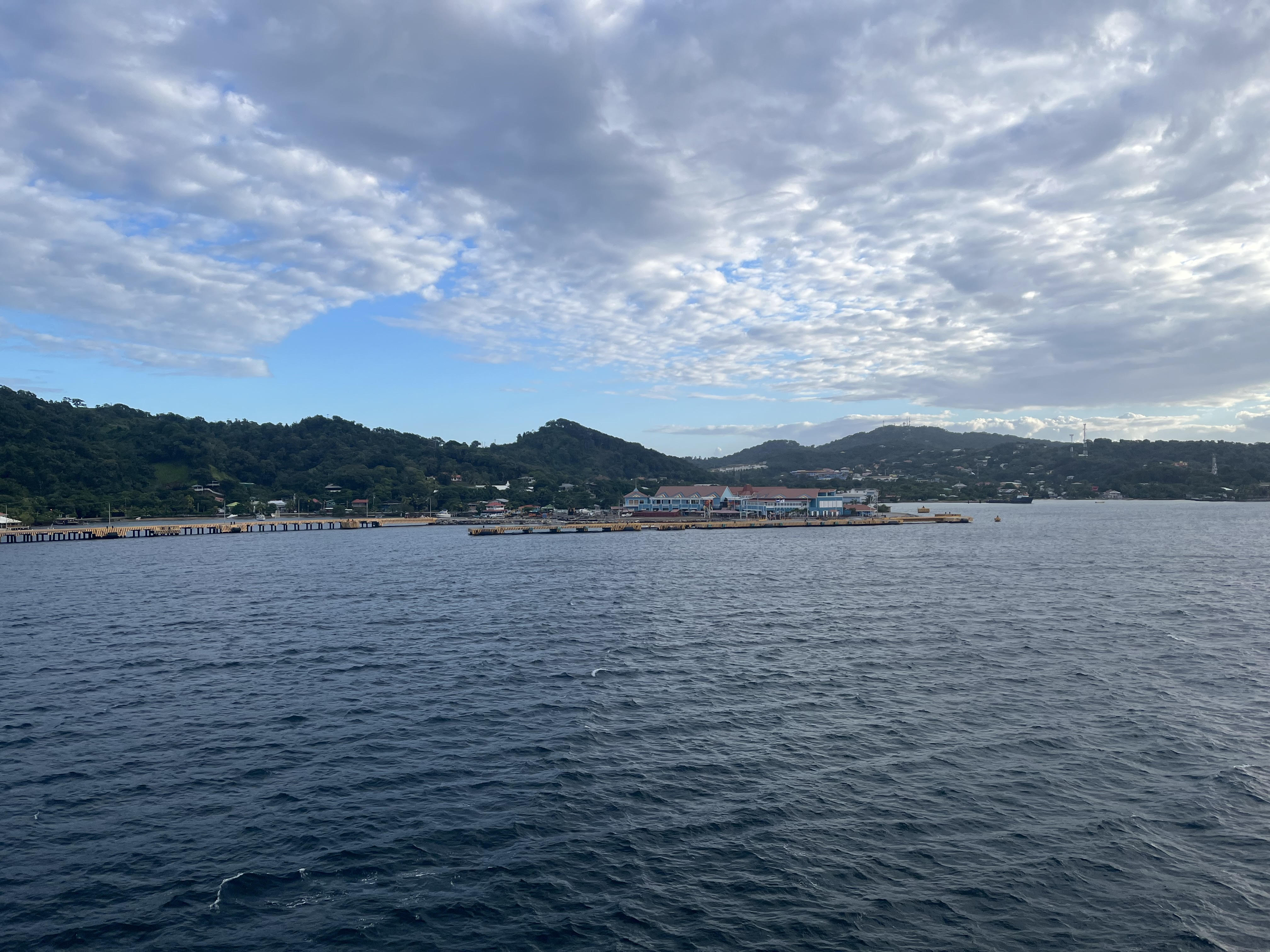
Roatan from cruise ship

Roatán is a coral island. Situated atop an exposed ancient coral reef, it rises to about 270 m (890 ft) above sea level. The easternmost quarter of the island is separated by a 15-meter-wide channel through the mangrove forest. This section is called Helene, or Santa Elena in Spanish. Satellite islands at the eastern end are Morat, Barbareta, and Pigeon Cay. There is a bay on the western side of the island called West Bay.

Most of the infrastructure is on the western half of the island. The most populous town of the island is Coxen Hole, capital of Roatán municipality, located in the southwest. West of Coxen Hole are the settlements of Gravel Bay, Flowers Bay and Keyhole Bay on the south coast, and Sandy Bay, West End and West Bay on the north coast. To the east of Coxen Hole are several cays, including Jesse Arch Cay, Sarah Cay, and Second Cay. Further to the east are the settlements of Mount Pleasant, French Harbour, French Cay, First Bight, Parrot Tree, Jonesville and Oakridge on the south coast, and Punta Gorda on the north coast.

== History ==
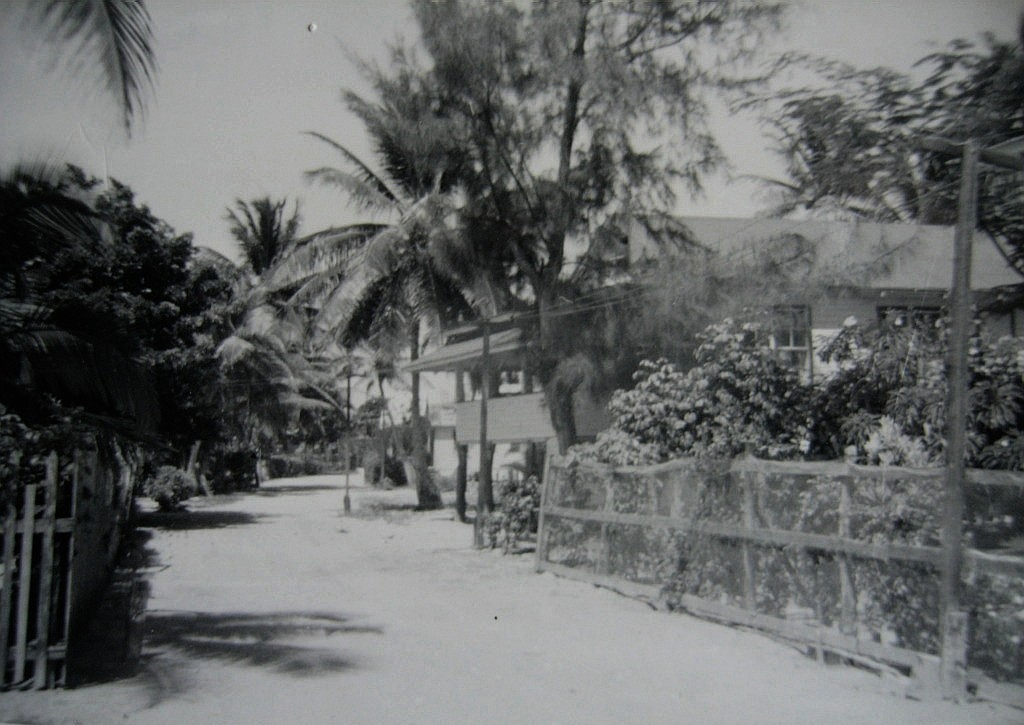
French Harbour in the 1960s

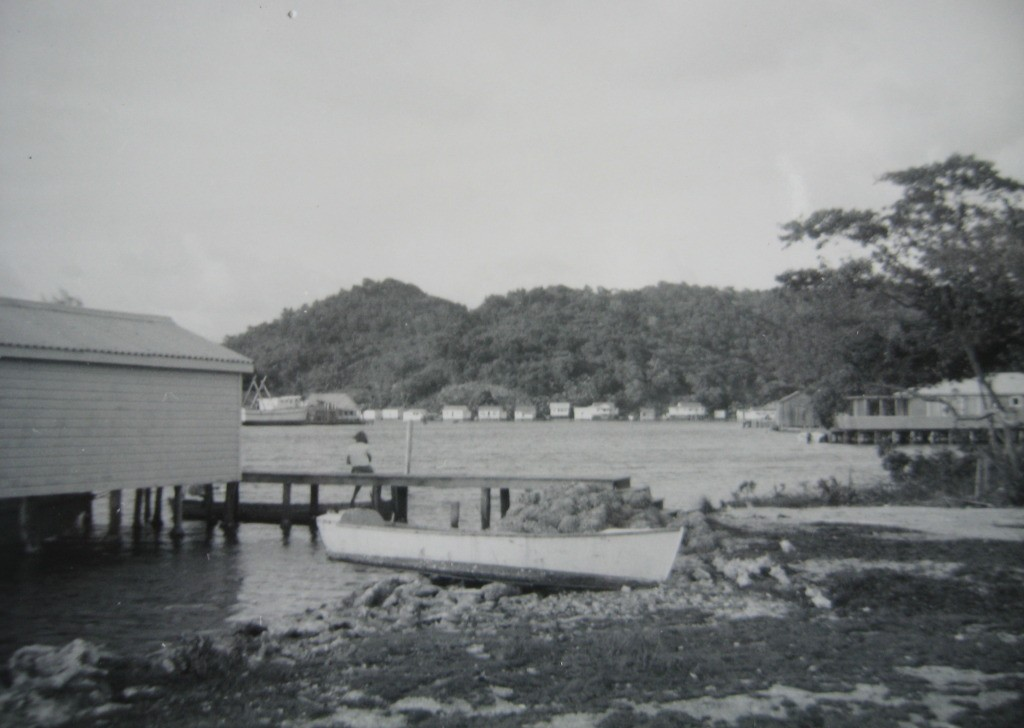
Oak Ridge in the 1960s

The indigenous people of the Bay Islands are believed to have been related to either the Paya, the Maya, the Lenca or the Tolupan, which were the tribes present on the mainland. Christopher Columbus visited the neighboring island of Guanaja on his fourth voyage (1502–1504). Soon after, the Spanish began trading in the islands for slave labour. More devastating for the local people was exposure to infectious diseases to which they had no immunity, such as smallpox and measles.

Throughout the European colonial era, the Bay of Honduras attracted an array of individual settlers, pirates, traders and military forces. Various economic activities were engaged in and political struggles played out between the European powers, chiefly Britain and Spain. Sea travellers frequently stopped over at Roatán and the other islands as resting points. On several occasions, the islands were subject to military occupation. In contesting with the Spanish for colonisation of the Caribbean, the English occupied the Bay Islands on and off between 1550 and 1700.

During this time, buccaneers found the vacated, mostly unprotected islands a haven for safe harbour and transport. English, French and Dutch pirates established settlements on the islands. They frequently raided the Spanish treasure ships, cargo vessels carrying gold and silver from the New World to Spain. In 1722, fisherman Philip Ashton was captured by the pirate Edward Low and managed to escape on a watering rendezvous on Roatan. His noted account of his subsequent year spent on the uninhabited island provides a glimpse of the island after the eradication of the Paya and before colonisation.

During the War of the Austrian Succession, a British Army detachment under the command of John Caulfield garrisoned the island from 1742 to 1749. The garrison originally consisted of two companies of Gooch's American Regiment, but these were eventually amalgamated into the 49th Regiment of Foot (later amalgamated as part of the Cardwell Reforms into the Royal Berkshire Regiment).

In 1797, the British defeated the Garifuna, who had been supported by the French, in a conflict for control of the Windward Caribbean island of St. Vincent as part of the Second Carib War. The British then deported the Garifuna to Roatán. The majority of the Garifuna migrated to Trujillo on mainland Honduras, but a portion remained to found the community of Punta Gorda on the northern coast of Roatán. The Garifuna, whose ancestry includes Arawak and Maroons, remained in Punta Gorda, becoming the Bay Island's first permanent post-Columbian settlers. They also migrated from there to parts of the northern coast of Central America, becoming the foundation of the modern-day Garífuna culture in Honduras, Belize and Guatemala.

The majority permanent population of Roatán originated from the Cayman Islands. They arrived in the 1830s shortly after the passage of the 1833 Slavery Abolition Act; the changes in the labour system disrupted the economic structure of the Caymans. The islands had a largely seafaring culture; natives were familiar with the area from turtle fishing and other activities. Former slaveholders from the Cayman Islands were among the first to settle in the seaside locations throughout primarily western Roatán. During the late 1830s and 1840s, former slaves also migrated from the Cayman Islands, in larger number than planters. All together, the former Cayman peoples became the largest cultural group on the island.

For a brief period in the 1850s, Britain declared the Bay Islands its colony. Within a decade, the Crown ceded the territory formally back to Honduras. British colonists were sent to compete for control. They asked American William Walker, a freebooter (filibuster) with a private army, to help end the crisis in 1860 by establishing an independent, English-speaking government over the islands; he eventually fell into the custody of the Honduran government, which executed him.

In the 20th century, there was continued population growth resulting in increased economic changes and environmental challenges. A population boom began with an influx of Spanish-speaking Mestizo migrants from the Honduran mainland. Since the late 20th century, they tripled the previous resident population. Mestizo migrants settled primarily in the urban areas of Coxen Hole and Barrio Los Fuertes (near French Harbour). Even the mainlander influx was dwarfed in number and economic effects by the overwhelming tourist presence in the 21st century. Numerous American, Canadian, British, New Zealander, Australian and South African settlers and entrepreneurs engaged chiefly in the fishing industry. Later, the diving industry, provided the foundation for attracting the tourist trade.

In 1998, Roatán suffered some damage from Hurricane Mitch, temporarily paralysing most commercial activity. The storm also broke up the popular dive-wrecks Aguila and Odyssey.

== Demographics ==
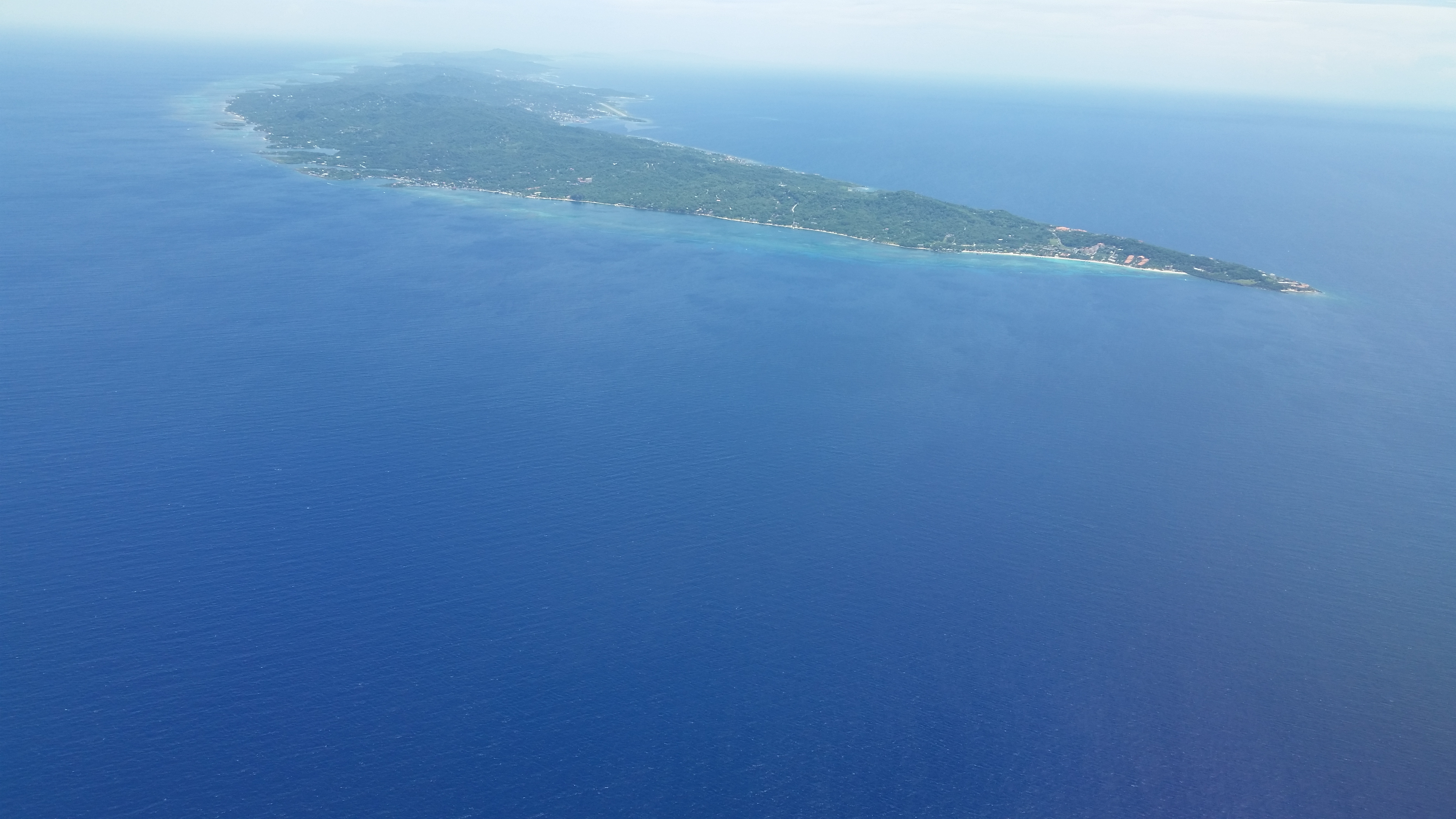
Roatán looking southeast with West Bay on the right and Coxen Hole and Manuel Galvez airport in the upper middle.

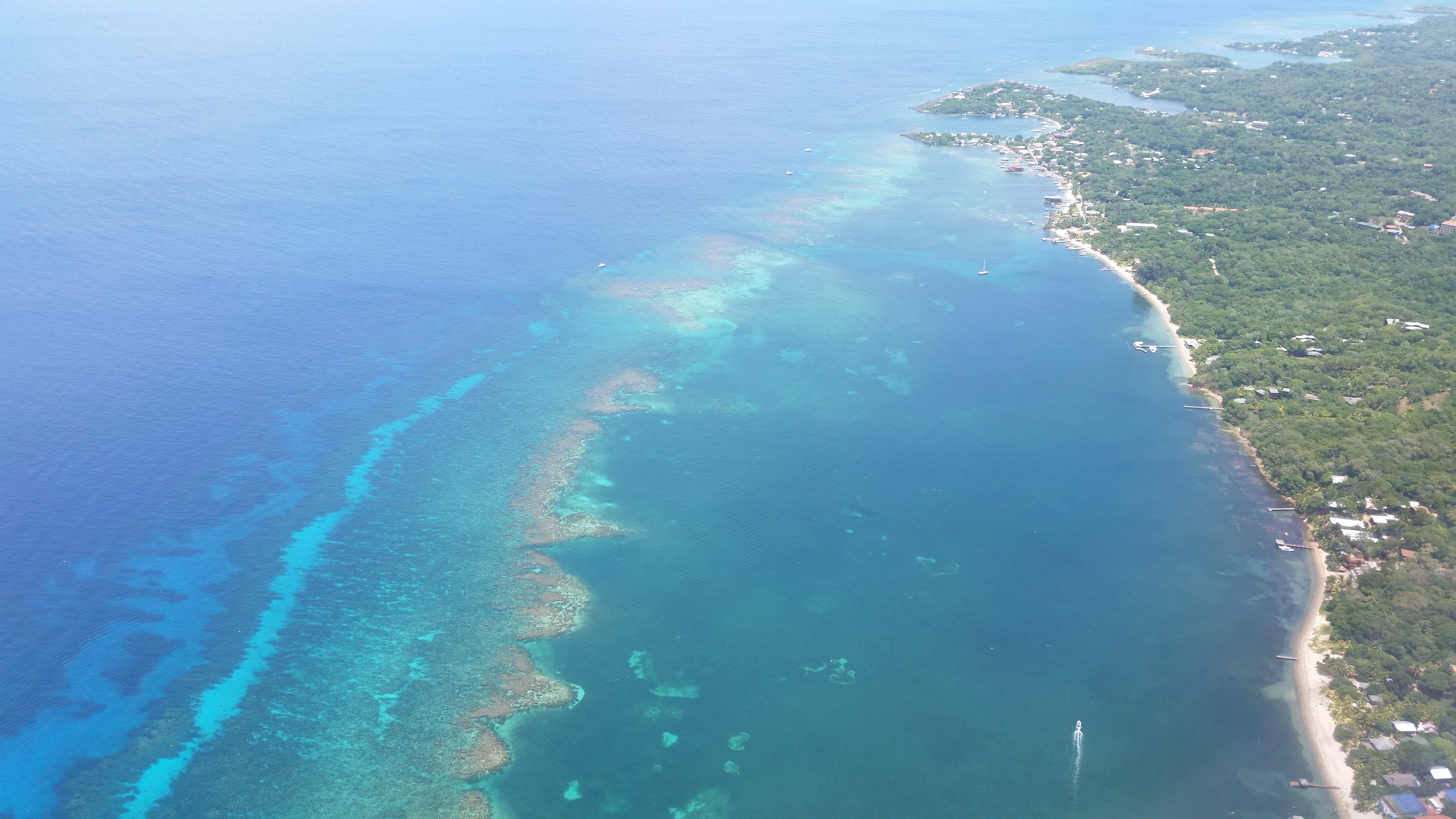
Roatán looking north towards West End

At the time of the 2013 Honduras census, Roatán municipality had a population of 41,831. Of these, 52.06% were Mestizo, 20.97% Black or Afro-Honduran, 12.41% White, 11.19% Indigenous (3.73% Chʼortiʼ, 3.49% Lenca, 1.26% Miskito, 1.07% Pech) and 3.37% others.

=== Islanders ===
The English-speaking people who have been established in Northern Honduras (specifically, the Bay Islands) since the early 19th century are chiefly of European and British-Afro-Caribbean descent and are called "Islanders" or "caracoles" (snails). People from the Honduran Bay Islands are culturally different from Hondurans living on the mainland because the islands are more connected to the English-speaking Caribbean. The two historic groups in Roatán came to the Bay Islands in the 1850s from the Cayman Islands. Both historic groups "Kriols" and "Caracoles" speak Bay Island English. They are called "caracoles" by Spanish-speaking Hondurans, a term deemed offensive by native Islanders who have a long-standing rivalry with Spanish-speaking Hondurans because of their differences in culture, language, beliefs and ideals. The region of the Bay Islands encompasses the three major islands of Roatán, Utila and Guanaja, the Hog Islands, as well as the smaller islands or cays. These people are also called "Islanders", especially locally.

Over time, the form of English spoken by the Roatán Islanders has changed. The language differs mostly in morphology but also in pronunciation and accent and, to a lesser extent, in syntax and vocabulary, from the English spoken in other regions of the Commonwealth Caribbean, as evidenced by the usage of a wide variety of old standard English terms and words throughout the islands. They are similar enough to be mutually intelligible and understood throughout the entire Bay Islands. The language can also be learned, although it is not taught in the general sense, whilst the accent derives from the wide variety of expatriates living and working on the Islands from North America and Europe.

== Environment ==
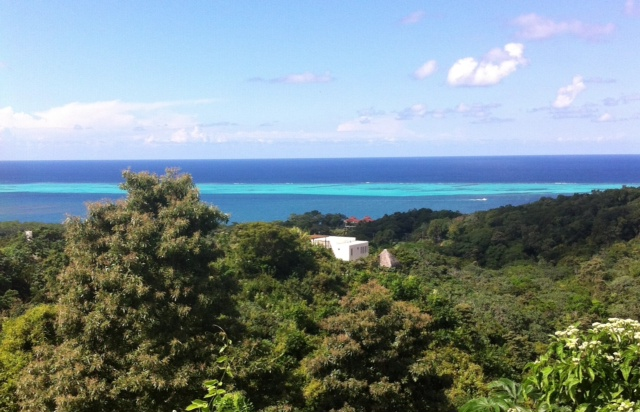
View from Big Bight over the Mesoamerican Barrier Reef System, second-largest barrier reef in the world

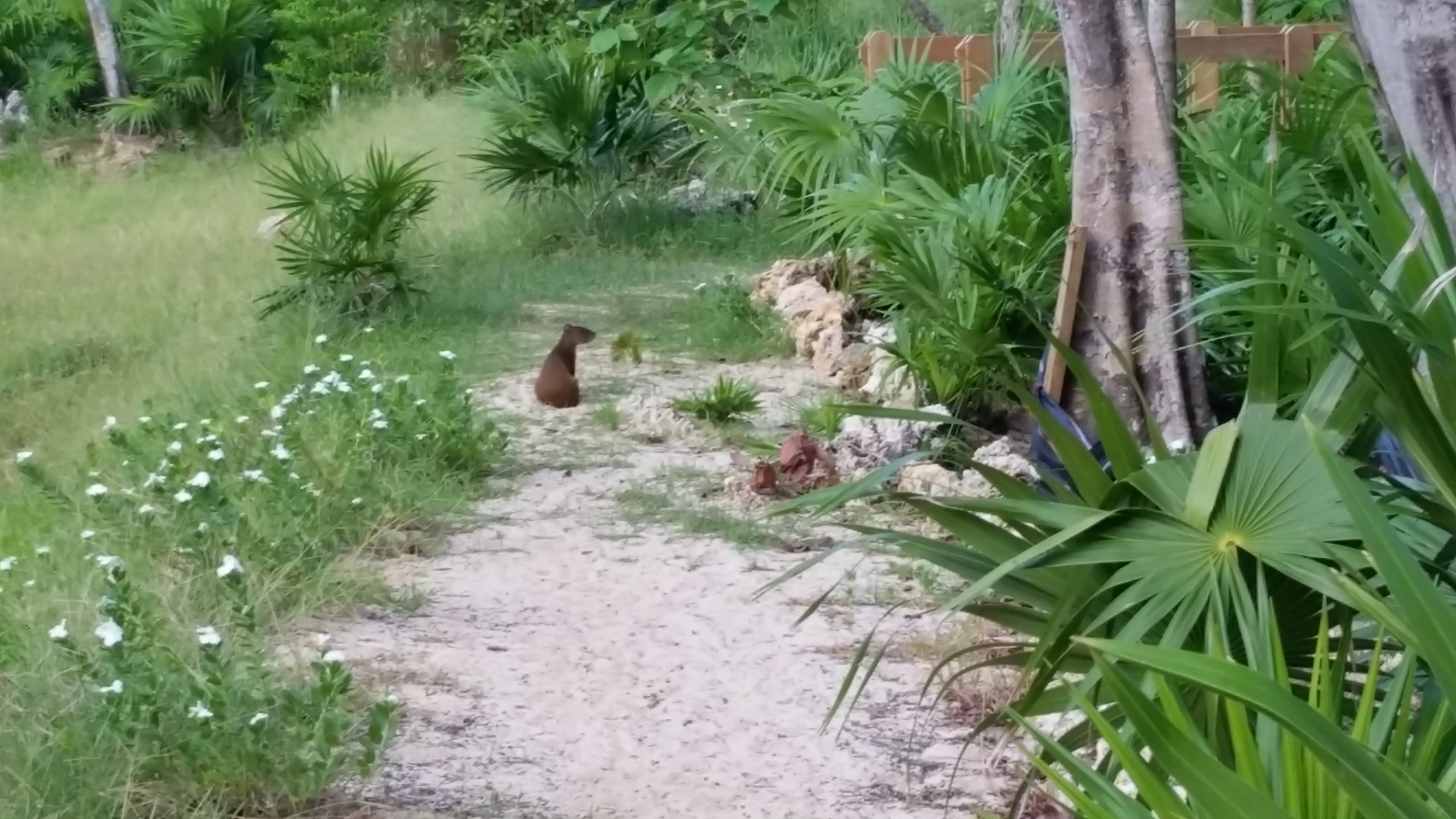
Roatán Island Agouti—Dasyprocta ruatanica

Roatán lies on the southern edge of the Mesoamerican Barrier Reef System, the second-largest barrier reef in the world.

Geomorphologically, the island's steep bathymetric gradient into the Cayman Trench promotes intense upwelling of nutrient-dense oceanic waters, nourishing dense fringing reef formations and vibrant wall-diving environments along its northern drop-offs. Reef systems are very delicate and have experienced massive damage and degradation worldwide. On Roatán, unchecked tourism development and an increased population are putting a strain on its natural resources. Deforestation, run-off, poorly managed waste treatment, and pollution are the main threats to the terrestrial and marine environments.

The city of Coxen Hole underwent a major reconstruction between the years of 2003 to 2005 adding new black water and septic lines as well as fresh water lines to accommodate the growing business sector and population. These lines are used in conjunction with the new water treatment plant and a waste management plant that recycles waste which are adjacent to the Roatán International Airport.

A similar project has been completed and now serving West End Village (the Island's tourism, social and diving hub) with even greater success than its predecessors. Although the project was initially met with some skepticism and anger at a tax hike proposed to help fund the project, it has turned out to be an overwhelming success with a new state of the art road, pumping station, sewer lines and drainage system. The project and its facilities are currently maintained and operated by ACME sanitation and solutions. It was not that long ago where "sanitation" was provided by hundreds of out-houses located at the ends of short boardwalks over the water. In the smaller communities, this "system" may still be in use. The Island has also expanded, repaved and revamped both its major highway roads with the south and north side portions being completed by mid-2020.

The Roatán Marine Park was the main force behind introducing recycling to the Island as well as the popular "Coastal clean up" projects that have become very popular among schools, residents and expatriate communities on the Island. The Marine Park is led by a team of professional divers, marine biologists and oceanographers. In 2019 the local government passed a law banning the use and sale of plastic bags, bottles, containers and styrofoam. The Island expects to continue passing comprehensive environmental and pollution reforms through 2020 and beyond.

=== Important Bird Area ===
The island is part of the Islas de la Bahía y Cayos Cochinos Important Bird Area (IBA), designated as such by BirdLife International because it supports significant populations of white-crowned pigeons, chimney swifts and yellow-naped amazons.

=== Roatán Marine Park ===
The Roatán Marine Park (RMP) is a grassroots, community-based, non-profit organization located on Roatán. The organization was formed in January 2005 when a group of concerned dive operators and local businesses united in an effort to protect Roatán's fragile coral reefs. Initially, the RMP's goal was to run a patrol program within the Sandy Bay-West End Marine Reserve (SBWEMR), to prevent over exploitation through unsustainable fishing practices. Over time, the organisation expanded the scope of their environmental efforts through the addition of other programs to protect Roatán's natural resources, including patrols and infrastructure, education, conservation and public awareness.

The East End Chapter of the Roatan Marine Park was created in late 2017 in an effort to expand the RMP's efforts across the entire island. The initiative and volunteer efforts saw an increase in fish coverage and a 200% increase in turtle nesting for the 2019 season, and new goals include expanding education outreach and local alternative livelihood programs.

=== Roatan Institute of Marine Science ===
The Roatan Institute for Marine Sciences (RIMS) was established in 1989 with the primary objective being the preservation of Roatán's natural resources through education and research. RIMS is located in Sandy Bay, specifically in Anthony's Key Resort, on the northwest coast of Roatán with over 50 kilometres (30 miles) of fringing and barrier reefs, seagrass beds, mangroves, and shoreline. Over the past twenty five years, RIMS has established itself as a teaching institution and is visited by colleges as well as universities from abroad to study nearby tropical marine ecosystems and the bottlenose dolphins kept by the facility.

=== Conservation ===
All reef systems throughout the Bay Islands are protected by the local and central government with help from charitable donations and those on the front line. Through local donations to the Marine Park and the many causes along with a concerted effort from the resorts on the island weekly clean-ups are undertaken to insure no metals or plastics litter the reef system and beaches as well as all major dive shops doing clean-ups on most of their daily dives. There are still obstacles to be defeated but the Islanders and expatriates living on the islands have taken a united stand to conserve and educate.

== Transportation ==
=== Airport ===
Juan Manuel Gálvez International Airport (RTB) on Roatán is one of four airports able to receive international traffic that is in service in Honduras. The other airports in Honduras are Ramon Villeda Morales International Airport (SAP) in San Pedro Sula, Toncontin International Airport (TGU) in Tegucigalpa, Goloson International Airport in La Ceiba (LCE), and Palmerola International Airport (XPL), in Comayagua.

The island of Roatán airport has a terminal that is served with nonstop international flights to Roatán from Houston, Atlanta, Dallas/Fort Worth, Miami, Denver, and San Salvador. Regional flights also operate to Puerto Lempira (PEU), Tegucigalpa (TGU), and San Pedro Sula (SAP). During the winter months, the island also receives international flights from Canadian-based airline, Sunwing Airlines, which operates flights to Montreal, Quebec City, and Toronto from mid November to mid April. Minnesota-based Sun Country Airlines also flies to Minneapolis from Roatan. WestJet started operations to the island in 2019.The island formerly had service to Milan, Italy, operated by Air Italy.

=== Ferry ===
The ferry Galaxy Wave provides service from Roatán to La Ceiba twice daily. The ferry Utila Dream by Dream Ferries provides service from Roatán to Utila to La Ceiba twice daily.

=== Cruise ships ===
==== Port of Roatan ====
The Port of Roatan in Coxen Hole is managed by Royal Caribbean Group and is the port of call for Royal Caribbean Cruises, Celebrity Cruises, MSC Cruises, Norwegian Cruise Line, Regent Seven Seas Cruises, Oceania Cruises, Virgin Voyages, and others. It is a two-berth port. This port also allows for ships to tender offshore. An expansion of the port was recently completed.

==== Mahogany Bay Cruise Center ====
The Mahogany Bay Cruise Center in Dixon Cove is owned and managed by Carnival Cruise Line. It is located approximately 5 kilometers east of the Port of Roatan. The port can accommodate two cruise ships concurrently and does not allow tendering offshore. A major expansion and a name change to Isla Tropicale is planned for 2026. Carnival Cruise Line, Princess Cruises, Holland America Line, and other subsidiaries of Carnival call on the Mahogany Bay port.

== Economic zone ==
Roatán contains a special economic zone "Zona de Empleo y de Desarrollo Económico" (ZEDE) or Zone for Economic Development and Employment, designated by Honduran constitutional provisions and legislation. The goal is to enable stable legal structures, physical environment, human rights, and taxation in order to encourage investment, migration, and economic development. It is the location of the private charter city of Próspera.

== See also ==
- Battle of Roatán
- Tourism in Honduras
