= Roatan Institute for Marine Sciences =

Scientific research center

Coordinates: 16.32803°N 86.57058°W

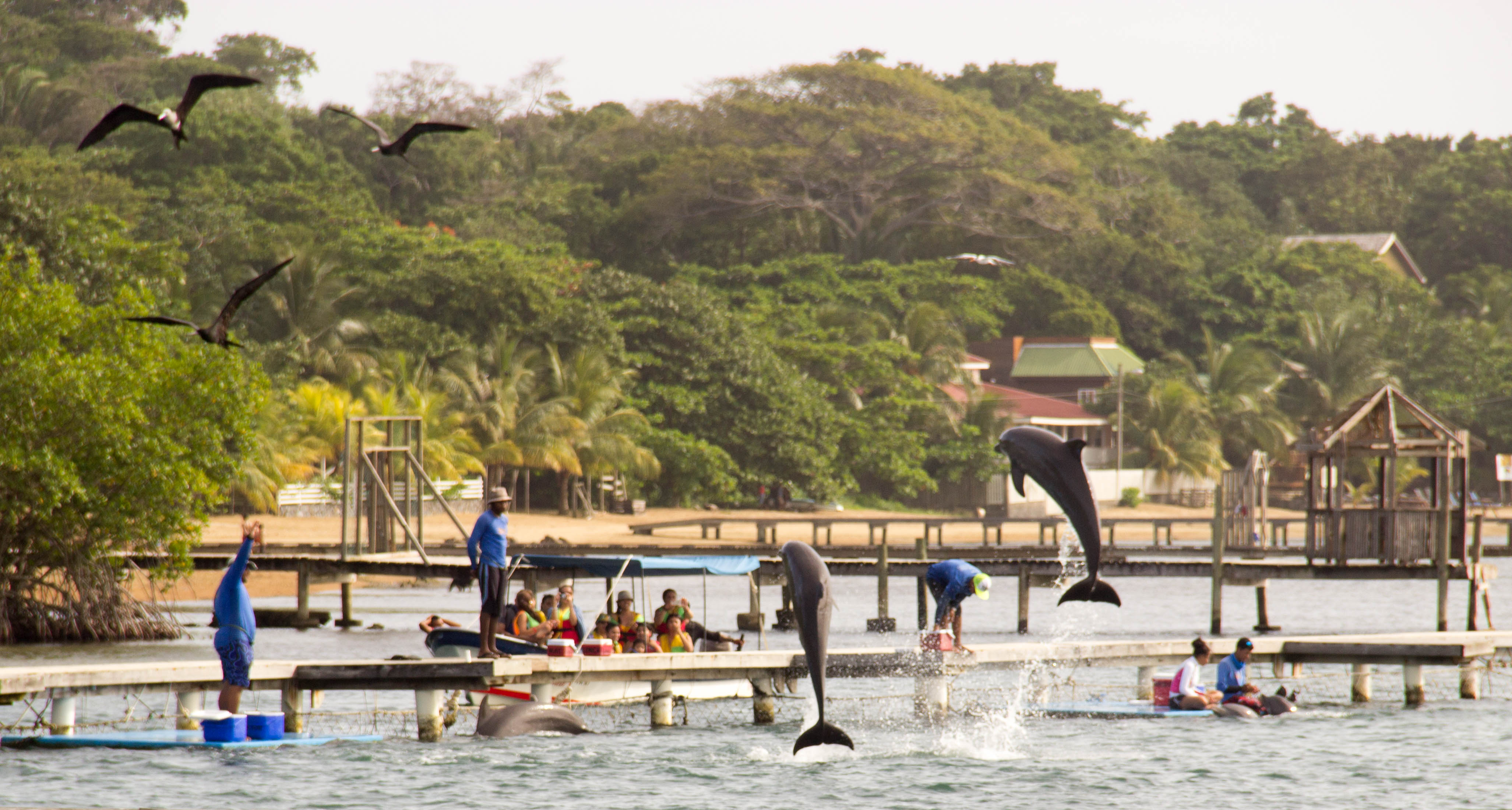
Dolphins at Anthony's Key Resort, Honduras

Roatan Institute for Marine Sciences (RIMS) is a scientific research center located in Roatán, department of Islas de la Bahía, in the Republic of Honduras.

It is part of Anthony's Key Resort, a tourist complex belonging to the Galindo family, that offers accommodations in bungalows, kayaking, spas, excursions and various interactions with captive dolphins such as swimming. It was founded in 1989 with the purpose of investigating coral reefs and aquatic life in general in the coastal zones of Honduras and the surrounding areas. The institute also has a small marine museum and the "Dolphin Discovery Camp" for the study of dolphin behavior (two when it started) and in 2017 the population of the dolphinarium was twenty-six cetaceans. Of these, seven were captured wild, one was rescued and eighteen were born there. They are spread over two coastal enclosures, one on the small island of Bailey's Key (Dolphin Encounter) and the other on the main island of Roatán (Dolphin Presentation).

The institute has scientific research programs that are visited by students from colleges, universities, and high schools from abroad.

Héctor and Iván are two of the dolphins, whose behavior was studied by the psychologist Dr. Stan Kuczaj. These dolphins use complex language with each other, which is the basis of scientific study to understand them better.
