= Jiaolong (city) =

Private city in Sichuan, China

Jiaolong (Chinese: 蛟龙; pinyin: Jiāolóng) is a private city in Shuangliu County, Chengdu, Sichuan, China.
