= Charter city (economic development) =

Planned community

A charter city is a type of city in which a guarantor from a developed country would create a city within a developing host country. The guarantor would administer the region, with the power to create their own laws, judiciary, and immigration policies outside of the control of the host country. Charter cities were first proposed by economist Paul Romer in a 2009 TED talk.

According to Romer, international charter cities would be a benefit to citizens by giving them an additional option about what system of economic policies they want to live under. In his vision, charter cities would adopt more pro-business policies than the host country, including lower taxes, fewer regulations, and protection of property rights, which would encourage international investment. Romer gives Hong Kong as an example, which he argues encouraged economic growth.

== Examples ==
After a meeting of Romer with president Marc Ravalomanana of Madagascar in 2008, Ravalomanana considered the idea of creating two charter cities. However, the plan was scrapped when the political leadership that supported the idea was removed from power.

In 2011, the government of Honduras considered creating a charter city, though without the oversight of a third-party government. Romer served as chair of a "transparency committee", but resigned in September 2012 when the Honduran government agency responsible for the project signed agreements with international developers without knowledge of the committee. In October 2012 the Honduran Supreme Court declared charter cities to be unconstitutional because the laws of Honduras would not be applicable there. However, after President Porfirio Lobo replaced several Supreme Court justices, a number of Zones for Employment and Economic Development (ZEDE) were created, including Próspera.

In 2018, Ledger Atlas, a cryptocurrency company invested in by Tim Draper, proposed a cryptocurrency-based Special Economic Zone in Papua New Guinea. A memorandum of understanding established Ledger Atlas as the governing entity, able to control migration, enact laws and issue passports. The proposal did not move forward, however.

El Salvador president Nayib Bukele announced plans for Bitcoin City, a Bitcoin-based charter city, in November 2021.

As of January 2023, several charter city projects are under development across Sub-Saharan Africa. Nigerian technology entrepreneur Iyinoluwa Aboyeji is building Itana as a hub for African tech workers outside Lagos. Other African charter cities include Nkwashi, Zambia, slated to host an African School of Economics campus, and Silicon Zanzibar, a new tech hub located on the Tanzanian island. The Rwanda Development Board has also announced plans to establish a catalytic investment fund for charter city projects across Africa.

== See also ==
- Micronation
- Zone for Employment and Economic Development (Honduras)
- Special administrative region
- Urban Enterprise Zone
