= Próspera =

Charter city in Bay Islands, Honduras

Próspera ZEDE
- Zone for Employment and Economic Development
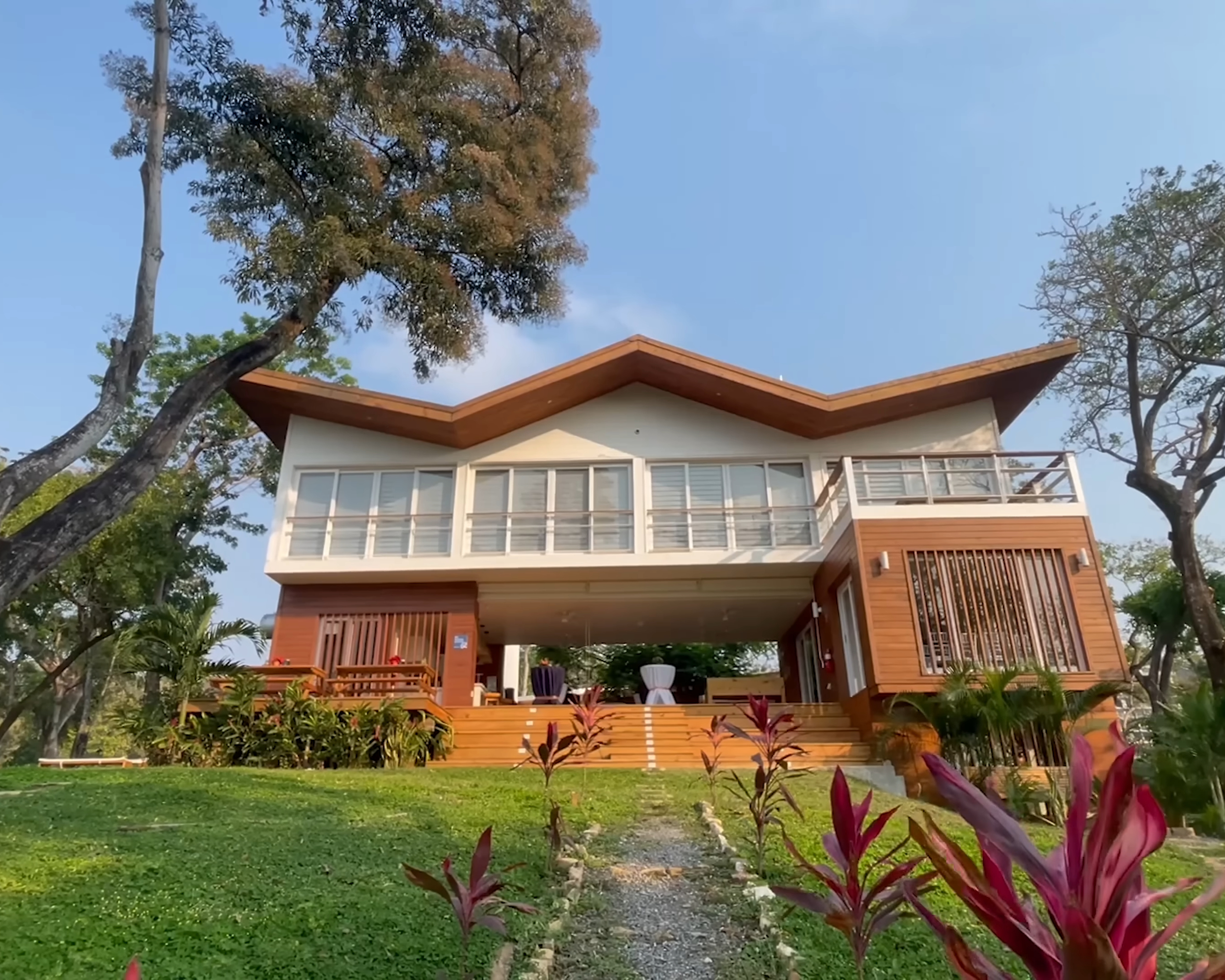
- The Beta Building, situated within Próspera, which serves as the ZEDE operational center

- Flag Seal Logo of Honduras Próspera, Inc., the developer and "guarantor" behind Próspera ZEDE.
- Nickname: "The Hong Kong of the Caribbean"
- Interactive map of Próspera ZEDE
- Location within Honduras
- Coordinates: 16°22′21″N 86°27′45″W
- Country: Honduras
- Department: Bay Islands

Government
  - Body: Technical Secretary; Honduras Próspera LLC; Council of Trustees; PZ Trust

Population (2024)
  - Total: 2,000
- Time zone: UTC-6
- Website: pzgps.hn (official gazette); prospera.co (e-governance)

Próspera, officially known as Próspera ZEDE, is a charter city on the island of Roatán, Honduras. It is one of three Zones for Employment and Economic Development (ZEDEs) in the country, operating under a distinct fiscal, legal and regulatory framework that grants it autonomy from the national government.

The project is led by Honduras Próspera Inc., which itself is funded by venture capitalists and has a veto vote in Próspera's governing council.

== History ==
=== Background ===
According to Canadian historian Quinn Slobodian, Próspera is part of a broader trend of projects aimed at implementing libertarian theory in practice.

The first attempts to create jurisdictions similar to Próspera in Honduras emerged with the Special Development Regions (Regiones Especiales de Desarrollo, REDs), which were intended to be administered by a developed guarantor country rather than private entities. However, the REDs were later declared unconstitutional for violating national sovereignty, and the ZEDEs subsequently served as their successors.

In 2013, during the presidency of Porfirio Lobo, the Constitution of Honduras was amended to allow the creation of Zones for Employment and Economic Development (Zonas de Empleo y Desarrollo Económico, or ZEDEs). These zones function as subnational territorial units with a high degree of autonomy, operating under a distinct legal and fiscal system. Unlike conventional local governments, ZEDEs possess independent administrative systems and laws, much like in special economic zones.

Próspera, located on the island of Roatán, is one of the most prominent ZEDEs and has been described as a modern iteration of the charter city model initially proposed by former World Bank chief economist and Nobel laureate Paul Romer, who has nevertheless criticized Próspera's libertarian ideology.

The idea behind charter cities is to establish new urban areas with governance structures that attract investment by ensuring rule of law, economic freedom, and regulatory efficiency. Próspera's model follows this logic, offering less restrictive regulations, lower taxes, and private arbitration for dispute resolution. It has also been heavily influenced by the Charter Cities Institute (CCI), a Washington, DC-based organization that promotes the development of such special jurisdictions worldwide.

The ZEDEs have been touted as "prosperity zones" where the law can be tailored to attract capital, and where the city does not adhere to governmental powers like taxation or policing; the ZEDEs have been tried in the U.S. but found pushback, which is why organizers have gone to places like Honduras.

=== Development of Próspera ===
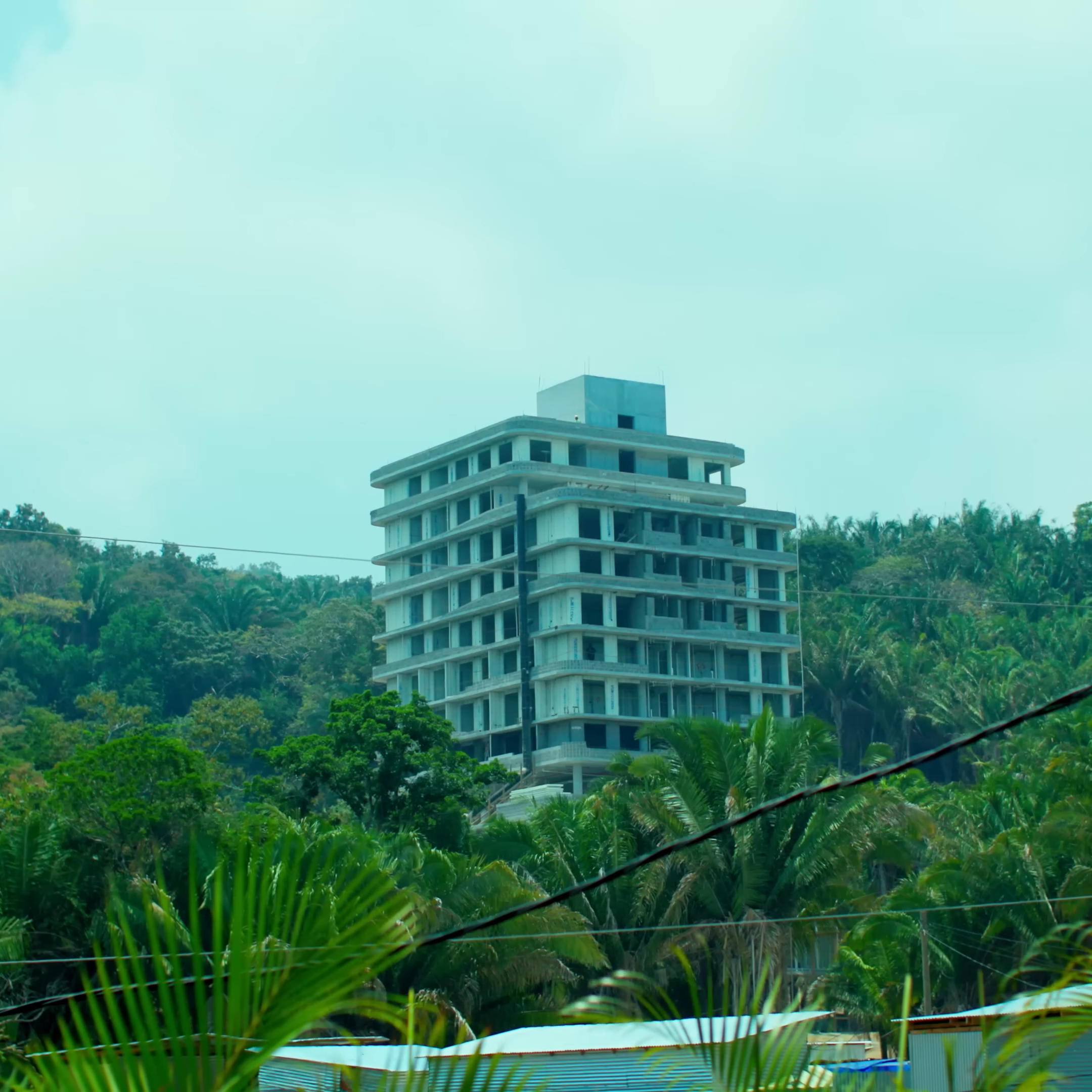
Duna Tower under construction in 2023, the tallest building in Roatán

Wealth fund manager Erick Brimen, a Venezuelan, created the idea of Próspera and is its CEO, along with being the CEO of NeWay Capital; Brimen said in 2024 that he conceived of the city as a "poverty relief initiative" for Honduras. Brimen formally applied for a charter city in Honduras in 2017. He used the intermediate companies Brimont Holding and North Shore Development Company to buy land on the island where Próspera is sited, as well as in mainland Honduras.

Próspera is also backed by multiple investors, including Balaji Srinivasan, Peter Thiel, and Marc Andreessen, through the venture capital firm Pronomos Capital. In January 2025, Coinbase CEO Brian Armstrong said that his company's venture capital division would be an additional investor in Próspera to "grow financial inclusion and innovation."

=== Construction ===
Construction began in 2021, with initial buildings designed by German architect Patrik Schumacher. In 2025 it was reported that robots were turning wooden blocks into construction materials at a location called "The Circular Factory."

=== Economy ===
Other than real estate sales, the city has held conferences such as 2024's biotech startup events which led to $1.5 million in venture capital investments; one of the themes was "Make death optional." Próspera also hosted a "crypto cities summit" in February 2025.

88% of revenue brought in by Próspera goes to the city, with the rest in a trust that is supposed to be spent on Honduran development.

== Governance and regulation ==
=== Administrative structure ===
Próspera is governed by a council composed of nine members, five of whom are elected and four appointed by Honduras Próspera Inc. Decisions require a two-thirds majority, effectively granting Honduras Próspera Inc. veto power. Above this, there is a Committee of Best Practices, an unelected body whose members are appointed by the Honduran government and tasked with approving internal regulations and providing policy guidance.

=== Security ===
Visitors wishing to enter Próspera must pass through gates with armed guards at a booth. These guards have clipboards and pens for visitors to sign a "temporary touristic access permit" that adheres to the community's legal code.

=== Regulatory environment ===
While subject to Honduran criminal law, Próspera maintains its own civil and commercial codes, allowing businesses to select regulations from approved foreign jurisdictions, propose custom regulations subject to Próspera's ZEDE approval, or operate under common law. Its charter disallows land expropriation.

=== Taxation and residency ===
Tax rates within Próspera are set at 1% on business revenue, 5% on wages, and a 2.5% sales tax. 2025 data says there is also a 5% personal income tax. Bitcoin is recognized as legal tender within the city.

=== Human subject research ===
In 2023, Bryan Johnson came to the ZEDE to be injected with a genetically enhancing drug. The drug, which was not approved by the FDA, stimulates bodily production of follistatin. Christin Glorioso, a neuroscientist and physician stated that "These [the drugs in question] have no evidence for working, don't make sense from a scientific perspective and likely will kill someone by inducing cancer or liver failure."

== Controversy ==
=== Repeal efforts ===
During her 2021 presidential campaign, Xiomara Castro made the repeal of the ZEDE law a key issue. In April 2022, Honduran President Xiomara Castro signed legislation to repeal the ZEDEs, citing sovereignty concerns. She referred to Próspera as a creation of a "narco-regime" and declaring self-governing ZEDEs like Próspera unconstitutional. Despite this, Próspera continues to operate, arguing that existing ZEDE agreements grant it legal stability for 50 years. In response to the repeal, Honduras Próspera Inc. sued Honduras for up to $10.7 billion in damages, equivalent to one-third of the country's GDP. In July 2022, the U.S. State Department expressed concerns that repealing the ZEDE law might violate international trade agreements, including the DR-CAFTA free trade agreement.

The founder of Próspera, Erick Brimen, also has spent hundreds of thousands of dollars to lobby U.S. legislators to put sanctions on Honduras and end U.S. aid to the country if the Honduran government does not allow Próspera to continue operations. In 2024, U.S. Representative Steven Horsford pressured Honduras by advocating for denying visas to their government officials if Honduras did not do as Próspera wanted (Brimen donated $5,000 to Horsford's campaign in 2023). In the 2024 U.S. House budget, members also tried to pressure Honduras to allow ZEDEs to continue how they wish. As of 2025, ZEDEs—including Próspera—remain operational despite ongoing legal disputes.

=== ICSID ruling on Próspera et al. vs. Honduras ===
In 2024, the International Centre for Settlement of Investment Disputes (ICSID) rejected Honduras's argument that Honduras Próspera Inc. and its affiliates should have exhausted domestic legal remedies before initiating arbitration, ruling that such a requirement was a matter of admissibility, not jurisdiction. The tribunal found that Honduras had unconventionally inserted this requirement into domestic law in 1988, yet it was never recognized in ICSID treaties, including CAFTA-DR. It also highlighted the contradiction in Honduras' position, which both required investors to exhaust local remedies and simultaneously forced them to waive their right to pursue local proceedings before arbitration. The ruling allows Próspera's $10.7 billion claim against Honduras to proceed, following the 2022 ban on ZEDEs by President Xiomara Castro and the 2024 Supreme Court decision declaring the ZEDEs unconstitutional with retroactive effect. The dispute was a major factor in Honduras' decision to withdraw from ICSID in August 2024, raising concerns about the country's commitment to international investment agreements.

=== Relations with the local community ===
Neighbors of the project in the nearby village of Crawfish Rock (which directly abuts Próspera) expressed a fear that their land might be expropriated after a drawing of later stages of Próspera appeared on the project website including parts of Crawfish Rock. Honduras Próspera's CEO has publicly supported legal reform to make the practice of expropriation illegal nationwide.

Lack of supposed Próspera earmarked development funds for Honduras have not made their way to the nextdoor Crawfish Rock where roads are still unpaved; and there are ongoing issues about ground water rights and sewage problems, as well as Próspera utilizing Roatan's garbage dump, electricity, and airports with inequities.

=== Lawsuits against Próspera ===
Since December 2025, Prospera has been involved in ongoing legal cases in the United States, covering issues from fraud to defamation. Among these cases, the most prominent ones are the ones initiated by Magatte Wade, an African entrepreneur, and another by Minicircle, the leading advocate for the biotech proof-of-concept project within the ZEDE.

== Bibliography ==
- Aust, Helmut Philipp; Rodiles, Alejandro (2023). "Cities and local governments". In Eslava, Luis; Buchanan, Ruth; Pahuja, Sundhya; Murphy, Caitlin (eds.). The Oxford Handbook of International Law and Development. New York: Oxford University Press. doi:10.1093/oxfordhb/9780192867360.001.0001. ISBN 978-0-19-286736-0. LCCN 2023937467.
- Hadfield, Gillian K. (2017). Rules for a Flat World. New York: Oxford University Press. ISBN 978-0-19-991653-5. LCCN 2016023437.
- Slobodian, Quinn (2023). Crack-Up Capitalism. Penguin Random House. ISBN 978-0-241-46024-5.
