= The Nerd Reich =

2026 non-fiction book by Gil Durán

- First edition cover
- Author: Gil Durán
- Subject: Politics of Silicon Valley
- Genre: Non-fiction
- Publisher: Avid Reader Press
- Publication date: August 18, 2026
- Pages: 352
- ISBN: 978-1-668-22140-2
- OCLC: 1554722478

The Nerd Reich: Silicon Valley Fascism and the War on Democracy is a 2026 non-fiction book by American journalist Gil Durán, who argues that some venture capitalists in Silicon Valley use technologies such as cryptocurrency and artificial intelligence to undermine democracy in the United States in an attempt to establish a new form of governance resembling a corporate dictatorship. To mitigate these threats, Durán suggests banning crypto, identifying network state proposals as anti-government extremism, breaking up tech monopolies, and regulating AI.

== Background ==
Gil Durán is an independent journalist based in San Francisco. He began his career at the San Jose Mercury News. He also spent 15 years as a communications professional working for Jerry Brown, Antonio Villaraigosa, Dianne Feinstein, and then-attorney general Kamala Harris. Durán began collaborating with linguist George Lakoff on the FrameLab newsletter and podcast in 2017. The following year, he became the California opinion editor for The Sacramento Bee and later served as the editorial page editor for the San Francisco Examiner.

He was at The Examiner when tech leaders helped recall four public officials in San Francisco in a single year, (Note: In 2022, San Francisco voters recalled three Board of Education commissioners (Alison Collins, Gabriela López, and Faauuga Moliga) and one district attorney (Chesa Boudin). See the 2022 San Francisco Board of Education recall elections and the 2022 San Francisco District Attorney recall election.) a rare event that had only previously succeeded in 1914. Curious, Durán began to look deeper. The investigation led him to Garry Tan of Y Combinator and an idea known as effective accelerationism. Research by local activist Emily Mills in 2023, published on Twitter, revealed the concept of the network state and its connections with Tan.

Durán began publishing his own newsletter in February 2024. Known as "Parallel Mirror", it was influenced by his work with Lakoff and focused on political messaging used in San Francisco Bay Area politics. That same year, he published a series of articles related to the Nerd Reich, beginning in The San Francisco Chronicle. A five-part series on the network state followed in The New Republic throughout the year. The third article in the series, published in April, covered Balaji Srinivasan. It went viral and led to an unnamed cryptocurrency expert contacting him privately with the message, "You know, we've been calling these guys the Nerd Reich for years." Durán adopted the new term, (Note: Durán first heard the term in 2024, but columnist Declan Lynch of the Sunday Independent claimed it was originally coined in 2017. An early example can be traced to British technologist Ben Vickers, who used the term in his essay "immutability mantra" [sic], which was published by Torque and Furtherfield in the book Artists Re:Thinking the Blockchain (2017). The essay is steeped in the language of tescrealism and speaks in an almost religious tone about an impending global technocracy made possible by the blockchain.) registering the domain name, renaming his newsletter, and using it as a working title for his book.

== Synopsis ==
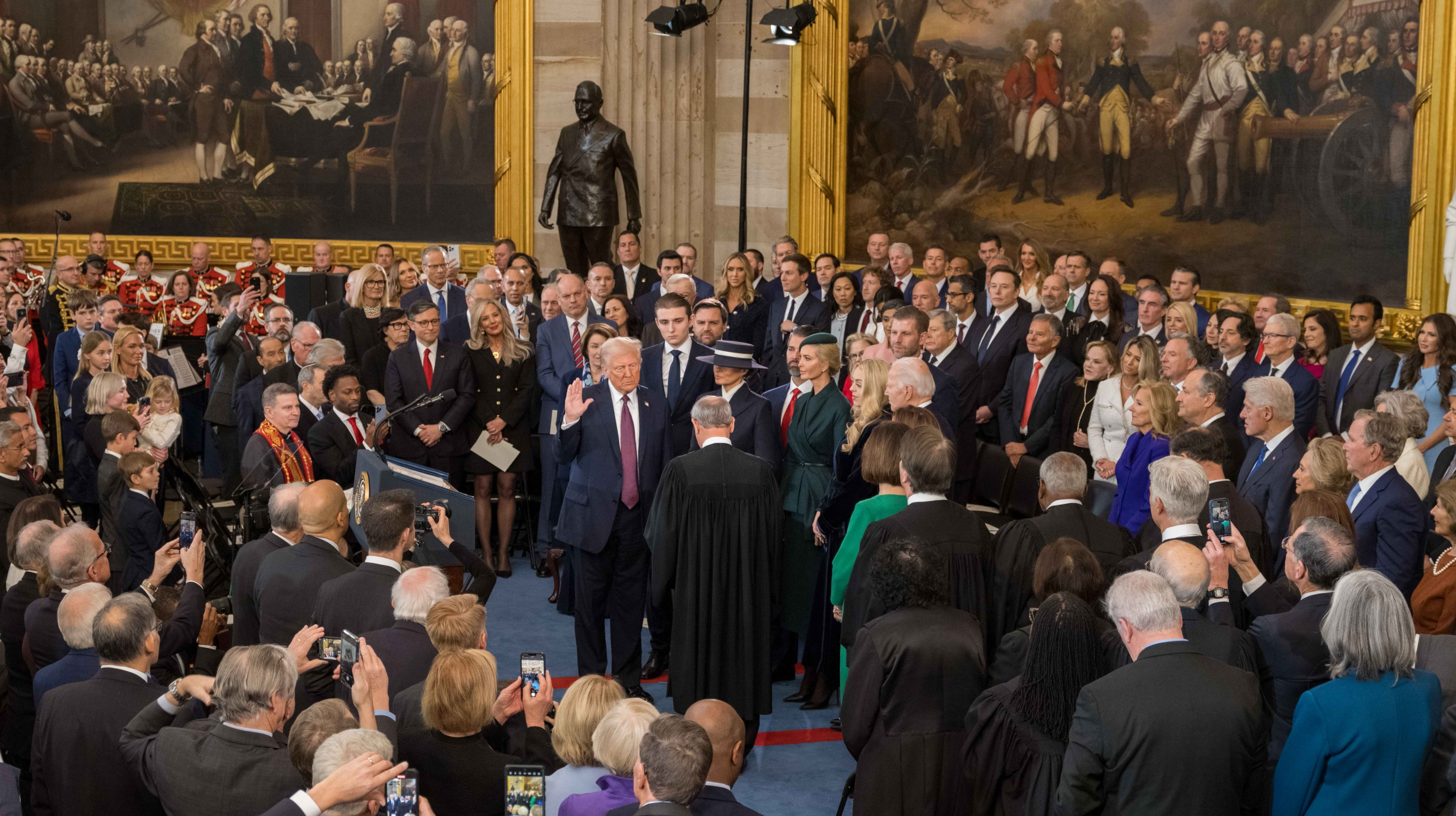
The "Nerd Reich" at the 2025 presidential inauguration (from center right)

In eight chapters, Durán explores the origin of the "tech–industrial complex" that outgoing U.S. President Joe Biden warned the country about in his 2025 farewell address. He begins the story of tech fascism in 1997, with the publication of The Sovereign Individual, an unusual book that would have a great deal of influence on Peter Thiel, leading him to invest in cryptocurrency and develop working relationships with computer programmer Curtis Yarvin and entrepreneur Balaji Srinivasan, culminating in the protégé of JD Vance, the Vice-President of the United States.

Durán's central thesis is that the attack on American democracy is openly organized and promoted by venture capitalists in Silicon Valley, including Thiel, Yarvin, Srinivasan, and Vance, in a working coalition with the MAGA movement that views President Donald Trump as a kind of political technology to achieve their goals. Built on a foundation of so-called technolibertarianism, Durán believes the veneer of techno-optimism based on promises of innovation and progress has been slowly worn away by Silicon Valley's support for the Trump regime, revealing a core ideology rooted in technocracy, antidemocracy, and ultimately tech fascism. All of this is facilitated by tech and crypto money that captures institutions, with the intention to control and end the independence of academia, the media, and government, essentially eliminating any public opposition to their ideas.

With the creation of network states, (Note: The idea of a utopian, sovereign community like a network state is not new. Ayn Rand is often given credit for promoting a modern version of the idea in her novel Atlas Shrugged (1957). In the story, the community is referred to as Galt's Gulch, which was based on the real town of Ouray, Colorado. Many of the tech leaders referred to as part of the "Nerd Reich" acknowledge Rand as a formative influence.) which allows tech oligarchs to operate outside the nation state on their own terms, they can exit democracy itself, their ultimate goal, becoming fully autonomous and answerable to no country or established set of laws. In an early example of the network state that he referred to as "Patchwork" states, Yarvin proposed creating a surveillance state in San Francisco where the "underclass", he joked, could be converted into biodiesel to power public transportation. Srinivasan also proposed that network states could discriminate and segregate as they liked according to their unique values. In one example, he proposed "purging" all liberals. (Note: Durán: "...Srinivasan [began] to fantasize about purging the liberals from San Francisco." "Srinivasan defines the Blue political tribe as the liberal voters he implies are responsible for the city's problems. Blues will be banned from the Gray-controlled zones [tech company occupied areas], said Balaji, unlike Republicans ('Reds')." "This would be bad news for the Blues—the Democrats and progressives who make up most of San Francisco's voting population...'Take total control of your neighborhood,' he said. 'Push out all Blues. Tell them they're... unwelcome… push out all Blues.') The idea of the network state was embraced by the Trump administration in the form of Freedom Cities, while also being actively pursued by billionaires all over the world; some of the most notable proposals include California Forever, Telosa, Praxis, and Próspera.

Durán warns that these beliefs resemble a millenarian religious cult that espouses fringe ideas like eugenics, with unproven ideas about the future of humanity being used as a kind of "apocalyptic capitalism". This strategy allows tech companies to receive billions in government contracts with little to no regulation and to capture the remaining levers of democratic governance for their own use. The public is reduced to serfs within this system of technofeudalism, with the tech industry owning and managing everything. Durán also expresses his concern that the power of crypto donors has made the Democratic Party vulnerable to the same corrupting influence as the Republican Party. He suggests banning crypto, identifying network state proposals as forms of anti-government extremism, breaking up tech monopolies, and regulating AI to mitigate these emerging threats to the United States.

== Release and reception ==
The Nerd Reich was first published by Simon & Schuster under the Avid Reader Press imprint and released on August 18, 2026, along with an e-book and audiobook edition read by the author. Durán launched a book tour in the United States after the release, with events scheduled in San Francisco, Oakland, Chicago, and Baltimore. The book debuted on the New York Times Best Seller list for non-fiction hardcovers at #3 for the week ending August 22, 2026.

== Analysis ==
Media studies and transhumanist scholar Alexander Thomas of the University of East London describes the concept of the "Nerd Reich" as a new political formation in which the power of billionaires and authoritarian strands of transhumanism converge. Thomas also attempts to use the example of the "Nerd Reich" to put to rest older claims, such as those by German philosopher Stefan Lorenz Sorgner, who previously asserted that transhumanism does not defend a "non-liberal [position]". Thomas shows how Durán's concept exemplifies the non-liberal nature of modern transhumanism that others have either previously ignored or denied. James Hughes had previously warned about the looming threat in 2014, noting that Thiel had attempted to take over Humanity+ (formerly known as the World Transhumanist Association) in the late 2000s.

There are discussions about the book's use of the term "fascism". Henrique Cortez agrees with the book's arguments about the concentration of power in the hands of antidemocratic venture capitalists, while noting that fascism is a loaded term and critics of the work might see "a more heterogeneous phenomenon, one that blends libertarianism, tech accelerationism, and plain old financial self-interest." Henry Mance writes that the book's discussion of what constitutes fascism (with a comparison between the alleged fascists' predilection towards a glorious future or Armageddon with Mussolini's search for a mythical past) is superficial. Anant Agarwala and Maximilian Probst write on Die Zeit that there are two camps who argue about this label, with the opponents saying that there are elements from historical fascism that are missing and the term prevents any dialogue, while supporters argue that the term might be useful even though there are differences. Agarwala and Probst say that there is an argument for the use of the term, as explained by Naomi Klein and Astra Taylor, who posit that history presents "a kind of spiral, pushing us to places that seem familiar but are fundamentally different" and that modern fascism is not about formations of the brown-shirts but about "the feverish, relentlessly monetization-driven, and bot-ridden present, in which everyone is always online."

== Antecedents ==
English media theorists Richard Barbrook and Andy Cameron of the University of Westminster published "The Californian Ideology" in 1995, an early critique of what they saw as the neoliberal bent in Silicon Valley. Paulina Borsook touched on the subject in 1996 in an essay for Mother Jones, later expanding it into her book Cyberselfish (2000). Later, David Golumbia of Virginia Commonwealth University studied cyberlibertarianism and the extremist, right wing politics of Bitcoin.

== Sources ==
=== Books ===
- Durán, Gil (2026). The Nerd Reich: Silicon Valley Fascism and the War on Democracy (1st ed.). Avid Reader Press. ISBN 978-1-6682-2140-2. OCLC 1554722478.
- Durán, Gil (2026). The Nerd Reich: Silicon Valley Fascism and the War on Democracy (E-book ed.). Avid Reader Press. ISBN 978-1668221426. OCLC 1614745932.
- Durán, Gil (2026). The Nerd Reich: Silicon Valley Fascism and the War on Democracy (Audiobook ed.). Simon & Schuster Audio. ISBN 978-1668155226. OCLC 1612094427.
- Robson, Garry (2026). "Building the 'nerd reich'? The MAGA technocrats and the digital hive". In Robson, Garry; Wordliczek, Łukasz (eds.). Rise of the Digital Technocracy. Edward Elgar Publishing. pp. 243–271. doi:10.4337/9781035390434.00018. ISBN 9781035390434. OCLC 1609541780.Full access available to users of The Wikipedia Library.
- Thomas, Alexander (2026). "On Social Democracy in Sorgner's Euro-Transhumanism". In Nutas, Andrei (ed.). Classical vs. Euro-Transhumanism: Antagonism or Convergence?. Posthuman Studies, 7. Schwabe Verlag. doi:10.24894/978-3-7965-5237-3. ISBN 978-3-7965-5237-3. OCLC 1548390967.
- Yarvin, Curtis (aka Mencius Moldbug) (2008). "Profit Strategies for Our New Corporate Overlords". Patchwork: A Political System for the 21st Century. Born Digital Monographic Reports and Papers. Ephemera Box. Princeton University Library. p. 28.

=== Journals ===
- Duarte, Marisa; Bastos, Marco (2026). "The Emergence of the Shallow State and the Capturing of Twitter". M/C Journal. 29 (2). Queensland University of Technology. doi:10.5204/mcj.3251.

=== Magazines ===
- "Best Sellers: Hardcover Nonfiction". The New York Times Book Review. 6 September 2026.
- Butler, Kiera (May–June 2026). "The God Complex". Mother Jones. Illustrations by Nicolás Ortega.
- Durán, Gil (26 April 2024). "The Tech Baron Seeking to Purge San Francisco of "Blues"". The New Republic.
- Colucci, Emily (22 June 2026). "Interviews: Gil Durán". Publishers Weekly. p. 14.
- Miller, Laura (16 August 2026). "Silicon Valley Dreams of Authoritarianism". Slate.
- Kofman, Ava (2 June 2025). "Curtis Yarvin's Plot Against America". The New Yorker.
- "The Nerd Reich: Silicon Valley Fascism and the War on Democracy". Publishers Weekly. Vol. 273, no. 25. 22 June 2026. pp. 41–42.
- "The Nerd Reich: Silicon Valley Fascism and the War on Democracy". The Week. Vol. 26, no. 1303. Future Publishing Ltd. 4 September 2026. p. 22. ISSN 1533-8304.Full access available to users of The Wikipedia Library.

=== Newsletters ===
- Durán, Gil (13 February 2024). "Into the parallel mirror". The Nerd Reich.
- Duran, Gil (22 July 2025). "Silicon Valley's 'silence is complicity.' Nerd Reich meets Decoder". The Nerd Reich.
- Duran, Gil (6 September 2026). "A common enemy". The Nerd Reich.

=== News sites ===
- Agarwala, Anant; Probst, Maximilian (25 September 2026). "Tech-Faschismus: Die Tech-Bros und das F-Wort". Die Zeit (in German).
- Cortez, Henrique (20 August 2026). "The Nerd Reich: How Silicon Valley Became a Technofascist Project". EcoDebate. ISSN 2446-9394.
- Hutchens, Gretchen (1 September 2026). "'Silicon Valley fascism' is waging war on democracy". ABC News. Australian Broadcasting Corporation.
- Mance, Henry (23 September 2026). "The Nerd Reich — have the tech elite given up on democracy?". Financial Times.
- Rose, Steve (5 August 2026). "'If we don't fight back, we don't have a future': the journalist taking on the 'tech fascists' of Silicon Valley". The Guardian.
- Streitfeld, David (27 November 2025). "The Writer Who Dared Criticize Silicon Valley". The New York Times.
- Truong, Kevin (28 July 2026). "The Nerd Reich: Are Silicon Valley billionaires building a new fascist world order?". The San Francisco Standard.
- Warner, John (29 August 2026). "Biblioracle: 'The Nerd Reich' looks at tech industry billionaires' impact on democracy". Chicago Tribune.
- Wolverton, Troy (11 August 2026). "New book blames tech elite for nation's 'existential crisis'". San Francisco Examiner.

=== Podcasts ===
- Durán, Gil; Jutel, Olivier (2 January 2026). "Inside the Tech Cult: How Venture Capital Plans to Exit Democracy". The Nerd Reich (Podcast). hdl:10523/49397.
- Fortt, Jon (21 July 2025). "Why tech billionaires want a 'corporate dictatorship'". Decoder. The Verge.
- Kelly, Fran; Durán, Gil (31 August 2026). "The Nerd Reich: How tech bros are chipping away at democracy". Radio National Hour (Podcast). Australian Broadcasting Corporation.
- Srinivasan, Balaji (guest); Torenberg, Erik (host); Romero, Dan (host) (8 September 2023). Balaji on the Tribal Lens, America's Blunder, and His Plan to Save San Francisco (Video). Moment of Zen.

=== Videos ===
- "Gil Durán and Wajahat Ali: The Rise of "The Nerd Reich"". Commonwealth Club of California. 24 August 2026.
