= Dark Enlightenment =

Anti-democratic, reactionary philosophy

The Dark Enlightenment, also called the Neo-Reactionary movement (abbreviated to NRx), is an anti-democratic, anti-egalitarian, and reactionary philosophical and political movement. It can be understood as a reaction against values and ideologies associated with Enlightenment, advocating for a return to traditional societal constructs and forms of government, such as absolute monarchism and cameralism. The movement promotes the establishment of authoritarian capitalist city-states that compete for citizens. Neoreactionaries refer to contemporary liberal society and its institutions as "the Cathedral", associating them with the Puritan church, and their goals of egalitarianism and democracy as "the Synopsis". They say that the Cathedral influences public discourse to promote progressivism and political correctness, which they view as a threat to Western civilization. Additionally, the movement advocates for scientific racism, a view which they say is suppressed by the Cathedral.

Curtis Yarvin began constructing the basis of the ideology in the late 2000s, drawing upon libertarianism and Austrian economics along with thinkers such as Hans-Hermann Hoppe and Thomas Carlyle. Philosopher Nick Land elaborated upon Yarvin's ideas and coined the term "Dark Enlightenment", applying it to his accelerationism as a means to achieve a technological singularity. The movement has also received contributions from prominent figures, such as venture capitalist Peter Thiel. Despite criticism, the movement has gained traction with parts of Silicon Valley, as well as with several political figures associated with United States president Donald Trump, including political strategist Steve Bannon, Vice President JD Vance, and Michael Anton.

The Dark Enlightenment has been described as part of the alt-right, as its theoretical branch, and as neo-fascist. It has been described as the most significant political theory within the alt-right, as "key to understanding" the alt-right political ideology, and as providing a philosophical basis for considerable amounts of alt-right political activity. University of Chichester professor Benjamin Noys described it as "an acceleration of capitalism to a fascist point". Nick Land disputes the similarity between his ideas and fascism, saying that "Fascism is a mass anti-capitalist movement", whereas he prefers that "capitalist corporate power should become the organizing force in society". Historians Angela Dimitrakaki and Harry Weeks link the Dark Enlightenment to neofascism via Land's "capitalist eschatology", which they argue is grounded in the supremacist theories of fascism. Neoreactionary ideas have also been described as "feudalist", or "techno-feudalist".

== History ==
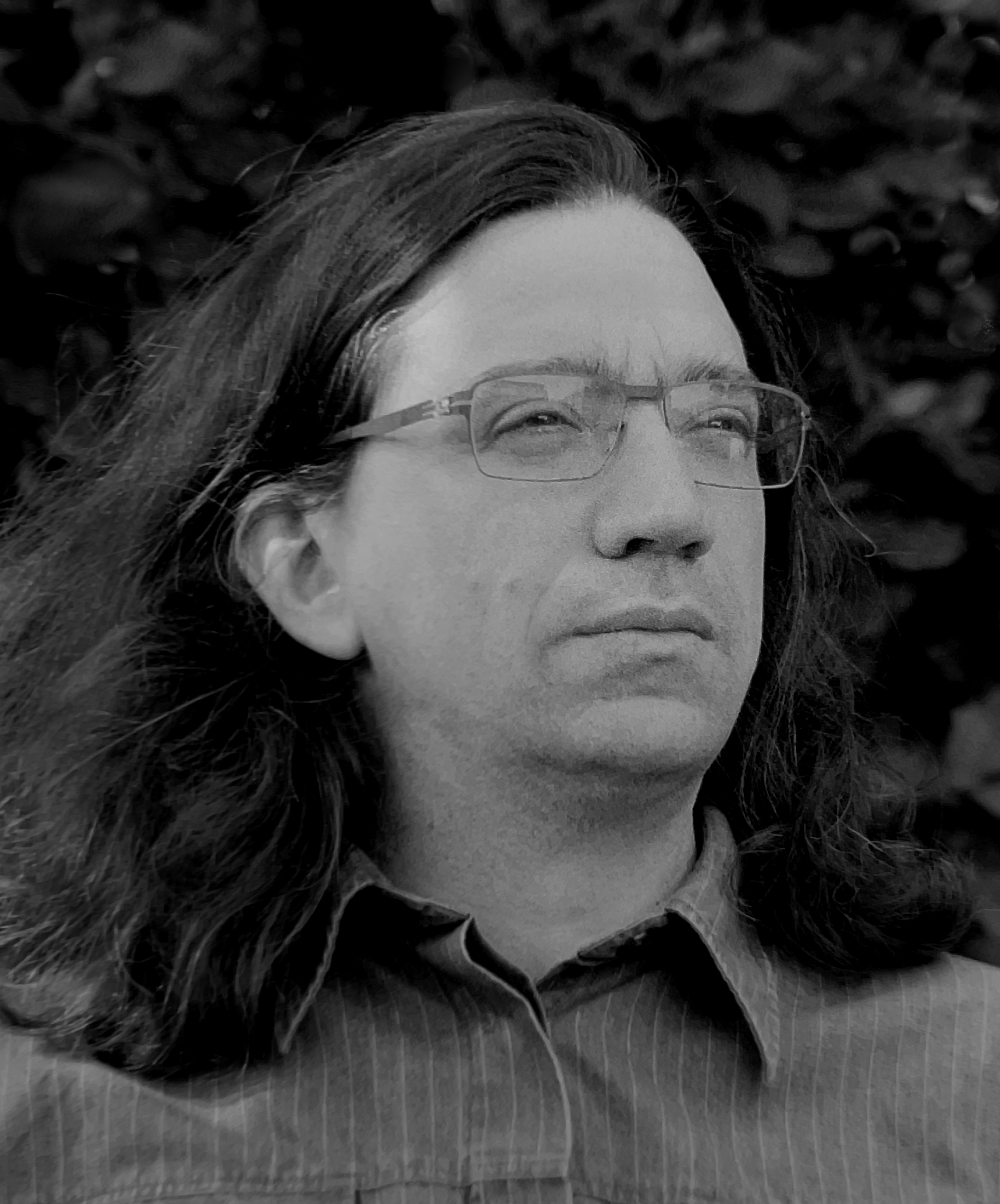
Curtis Yarvin is one of the founders of the movement.

Neo-reactionaries are an informal community of bloggers and political theorists who have been active since the 2000s. Steve Sailer and Hans-Hermann Hoppe are contemporary forerunners of the ideology, which is also heavily influenced by the political thought of Thomas Hobbes, Thomas Carlyle, and Julius Evola. In 2007 and 2008, software engineer Curtis Yarvin, writing under the pen name Mencius Moldbug, articulated what would develop into Dark Enlightenment thinking. Yarvin's theories were elaborated and expanded by philosopher Nick Land, who first coined the term "Dark Enlightenment" in his essay of the same name.

By mid-2017, NRx had moved to forums such as the Social Matter online forum, the Hestia Society, and Thermidor Magazine. In 2021, Yarvin appeared on Fox News' Tucker Carlson Today, where he discussed the United States' withdrawal from Afghanistan and his concept of the 'Cathedral', which he says is the current aggregation of political power and influential institutions that is controlling the country. Author Gil Duran stated that Yarvin's ideas share similarities with Nazi ideologies "but [have been] updated as rightwing dogma for the blogging age". Emerson Brooking, an expert in online extremism, said that "Yarvin escaped the fringe blogosphere because he wrapped deeply anti-American, totalitarian ideas in the language of U.S. start-up culture."

In February 2026, Curtis Yarvin and Nick Land met for the first time in San Francisco.

=== Influence in government ===
Several prominent Silicon Valley investors and Republican politicians have been associated with the philosophy. Steve Bannon has read and admired Yarvin's work, and there have been allegations that he has communicated with Yarvin which Yarvin has denied. Bannon would later consider Yarvin an enemy, which Yarvin did not reciprocate. Michael Anton, the State Department Director of Policy Planning during Trump's second presidency, has also discussed Yarvin's ideas, and Yarvin has claimed to have given staffing recommendations to him. In January 2025, Yarvin attended a Trump inaugural gala in Washington; Politico reported he was "an informal guest of honor" due to his "outsize influence over the Trumpian right." Marc Andreessen has quoted Yarvin and referred to him as a "friend", also investing in his startup Tlon and urging people to read him.

According to historian of conservatism Joshua Tait, "Moldbug's relationship with the investor-entrepreneur Thiel is his most important connection." Max Chafkin described Yarvin as the "house political philosopher" for Thiel's circle of influence (or "Thielverse"), including people such as Blake Masters, and Yarvin has referred to Thiel as "fully enlightened". Vanity Fair noted that both have been influential in the New Right and the National Conservatism Conference. Thiel had also invested in Yarvin's Tlon.

U.S. vice president JD Vance has cited Yarvin as an influence and has connections to Thiel. Prior to his election to the vice presidency, JD Vance cited in his 2022 Senate Campaign Yarvin's "strongman plan to 'retire all government employees,' which goes by the mnemonic 'RAGE.'" In a 2021 interview, "Vance said Trump should 'fire every single midlevel bureaucrat, every civil servant in the administrative state, and replace them with our people. And when the courts stop you, stand before the country and say, 'The chief justice has made his ruling. Now let him enforce it.'" Yarvin has praised Vance, stating "in almost every way, JD is perfect", but also considered his relationship with Vance overstated by the media, as they've rarely communicated. He also praised Trump for breaking from Republican practices of trying to "play ball and help the system work" and instead "trying to move all of the levers of this machine that he can move", though also stating "what he's doing is not at all what I would do with an opportunity like this. But I think that what I would do is probably not possible."

It has been suggested that the Department of Government Efficiency, or DOGE, bears resemblance to RAGE, as advocated for by Yarvin. Land, when asked by the Financial Times if he approved of DOGE, said "the answer is definitely yes", having also endorsed Steve Bannon's goal of "deconstruction of the administrative state". In a report by The Washington Post, two DOGE advisors described Yarvin as an "intellectual beacon" for the department, with one saying, "It's an open secret that everyone in policymaking roles has read Yarvin." The report said that Yarvin, initially approving of the Trump administration, had become critical of DOGE. He cited its handling of the National Science Foundation and National Institutes of Health, stating "Instead of fighting against these people because they're an enemy class who votes for the Democrats, you [should be] saying, 'Oooh, we have cookies for you.'" However, Tait said that Yarvin bears some responsibility for DOGE, saying, "It would have been created, probably, regardless. But he spent a good chunk of time creating a justifying framework for it." Political philosopher Danielle Allen said that DOGE is clearly based on Yarvin's work, and the outcome was the natural result of the shortcomings in Yarvin's views. CNN argues that Thiel, Andreessen, Vance and Anton do not deny that they are listening to Yarvin; however, they indicated that they do not accept all of Yarvin's theories:

An advisor to Vance denied the vice president has a close relationship with Yarvin, saying the two have met 'like once.' Thiel, who did not respond to a request for comment, told The Atlantic in 2023 he didn't think Yarvin's ideas would 'work' but found him to be an 'interesting and powerful' historian. And earlier this year [2025], Andreessen, who also did not respond to a request for comment, posted on X that one can read 'Yarvin without becoming a monarchist.'

== Beliefs ==
=== Opposition to democracy ===
Central to neoreactionarism's ideas is a belief in freedom's incompatibility with democracy, with Land having stated "Democracy tends to fascism". Yarvin and Land drew inspiration from libertarians such as Thiel, particularly his statement "I no longer believe that freedom and democracy are compatible" in a Cato Unbound essay. Yuk Hui additionally notes Thiel's contribution to the 2004 conference "Politics and Apocalypse" in which he argued that the U.S. needed a new political theory in the face of 9/11, which marked the failure of the Enlightenment, and that democracy and equality had made the West vulnerable. However, when asked by The Atlantic about Yarvin, Thiel opined that trying to radically alter the current U.S. government was unrealistic. He also suggested that Yarvin's methods would lead to Xi's China or Putin's Russia. Hui notes that neoreactionaries consider the Enlightenment values of democracy and equality to be degenerative and limiting, respectively. Tait considers Yarvin to have "a complex relationship" with Enlightenment values, as he adopts a secular and rationalist view of reality while rejecting its key political ideals of equality and democracy. Sergio C. Fanjul contrasts the movement's far-right critique of the Enlightenment with the Frankfurt School's critique of the Enlightenment as a Eurocentric prelude to colonialism and war.

Yarvin told Vanity Fair: "The fundamental premise of liberalism is that there is this inexorable march toward progress. I disagree with that premise." A 2016 article in New York magazine notes that "Neoreaction has a number of different strains, but perhaps the most important is a form of post-libertarian futurism that, realizing that libertarians aren't likely to win any elections, argues against democracy in favor of authoritarian forms of government." Journalist Andrew Sullivan writes that neoreaction's pessimistic appraisal of democracy dismisses many advances that have been made and that global manufacturing patterns also limit the economic independence that sovereign states can have from one another.

=== Support for authoritarianism ===
Yarvin supports authoritarianism on right-libertarian grounds, saying that the division of political sovereignty expands the scope of the state, whereas strong governments with clear hierarchies remain minimal and narrowly focused. Yarvin's "A Formalist Manifesto" advocates for a form of "neocameralism" in which small, authoritarian "gov-corps" coexist and compete with each other, an idea anticipated by Hans-Hermann Hoppe. Academic Jonathan Ratcliffe describes the model as "a network of hyper-capitalist city states ruled by authoritarian CEO monarchs." Yarvin claims freedom under the system, known as the "Patchwork", would be guaranteed by the ability to "vote with your feet", whereby residents could leave for another gov-corp if they felt it would provide a higher quality of life, thus forcing competition. Land reiterates this with the political idea "No Voice, Free Exit", taken from Albert Hirschman's Exit, Voice, and Loyalty model in which voice is democratic and exit is departure to another society:

"If gov-corp doesn't deliver acceptable value for its taxes (sovereign rent), [citizens] can notify its customer service function, and if necessary take their custom elsewhere. Gov-corp would concentrate upon running an efficient, attractive, vital, clean, and secure country, of a kind that is able to draw customers."

Yarvin has advocated for a "dictator-president" or "national CEO". He has described himself as a royalist, monarchist, and Jacobite; and has praised cameralism, Frederick the Great, and Thomas Carlyle. He is also influenced by Austrian economics, particularly Hoppe, Ludwig von Mises, Murray Rothbard, and Friedrich Hayek. Ava Kofman credits Hoppe's Democracy: The God That Failed with pushing Yarvin away from standard libertarian thought, with authoritarianism scholar Julian Waller saying "it's not copy-and-pasted, but it is such a direct influence that it's kind of obscene". Patrick Gamez notes that Land is "simply catching up to Murray Rothbard, Hans-Hermann Hoppe, Peter Brimelow, and assorted other radically right-wing libertarians and anarcho-capitalists, committed to 'cracking up' the democratic nation-state in favor of an 'ethno-economy.'"

Yarvin admires Chinese leader Deng Xiaoping for his pragmatic and market-oriented authoritarianism, and the city-state of Singapore as an example of a successful authoritarian regime. He sees the US as soft on crime, dominated by economic and democratic delusions. He additionally cites Dubai and Hong Kong as providing a high quality of life without democracy, stating "as Dubai in particular shows, a government (like any corporation) can deliver excellent customer service without either owning or being owned by its customers."

Andy Beckett stated that NRx supporters "believe in the replacement of modern nation-states, democracy and government bureaucracies by authoritarian city states, which on neoreaction blogs sound as much like idealised medieval kingdoms as they do modern enclaves such as Singapore." Ana Teixeira Pinto describes the political ideology of the gov-corp model as a form of classical libertarianism, stating "they do not want to limit the power of the state, they want to privatise it." According to criminal justice professor George Michael, neoreaction seeks to perform a "hard reset" or "reboot" on democracy rather than gradual reform. Neoreactionary ideas have also been referred to as "feudalist" and "techno-feudalist". Yarvin's proposals are not fully detailed beyond philosophy and general principles, and the economic ability to leave and the willingness of other locations to accept immigrants are not generally considered. Andrew Jones criticized his arguments as "vaguely defined and often factually incorrect".

==== Institutionalization ====
Yarvin describes his proposals as a modern version of monarchy and advocates for an American monarch dissolving elite academic institutions and media outlets within the first few months of their reign, stating "if Americans want to change their government, they're going to have to get over their dictator phobia." Time notes that Yarvin's proposal for a "Butterfly Revolution" envisions an internal coup to replace democracy with a privatized executive authority, which includes his RAGE proposal to "retire all government employees" in favor of loyalists. While conceding that it may not be possible, he stated that, were he in Trump's position, he would take executive control of government institutions such as the Federal Reserve, keeping those "that have a very clear role and are not politicized in any way" while disposing of others such as the State Department. He advocates constitutionally challenging laws such as impoundment control, birthright citizenship, and Marbury v. Madison, potentially defying the courts if it were necessary and "unifying". However, he also stated "if you're doing that in a situation where the vibe is like, 'This is going to be the first shot in the civil war between red America and blue America' ... I think it's bad", considering Trump and America "unready for that level of change".

He suggested in a January 2025 New York Times interview that there was historical precedent to support his reasoning, asserting that in his first inaugural address, Franklin Delano Roosevelt "essentially says, Hey, Congress, give me absolute power, or I'll take it anyway. So did FDR actually take that level of power? Yeah, he did." The interviewer, David Marchese, remarked that "Yarvin relies on what those sympathetic to his views might see as a helpful serving of historical references — and what others see as a highly distorting mix of gross oversimplification, cherry-picking and personal interpretation presented as fact." Scholars have described Yarvin's arguments as misrepresenting the historical record, and said that the historical autocracies he praises were considered deeply oppressive by their subjects.

=== The Cathedral ===
Neoreactionaries refer to contemporary liberal society and institutions which they oppose as the "Cathedral", considering them the descendant of the Puritan church, and their goals of egalitarianism and democracy as "the Synopsis". According to them, the Cathedral influences public discourse to promote progressivism and political correctness, and its adoption of liberal humanism is the primary reason for an alleged decline of Western civilization. A neoreactionary online dictionary defines the Cathedral as "the self-organizing consensus of Progressives and Progressive ideology represented by the universities, the media, and the civil service", with an agenda that includes "women's suffrage, prohibition, abolition, federal income tax, democratic election of senators, labor laws, desegregation, popularization of drugs, destruction of traditional sexual norms, ethnic studies courses in colleges, decolonization, and gay marriage." Yarvin views it as an oligarchy of educated elites competing for status, and has accused Ivy League schools, The New York Times, and Hollywood of being members.

Land and others argue that enforcement of political correctness by these institutions means that they are a religious entity, hence the term 'Cathedral'. Yarvin, described by El País as a former progressive, describes these institutions as a "twentieth-century version of the established church", with the educational system as a method for indoctrinating people into the Cathedral, enforcing compliance with progressive ideology and preventing them from thinking for themselves. Yarvin defines a church as "an organization or movement which tells people how to think", and includes schools as churches.

The concept of the Cathedral has been described as "fundamental to the alt-right's understanding of the humanities". Academic Andrew Woods describes the Cathedral as one of two central ideas that enable the alt-right to dismiss criticism, the other being cultural Marxism. He writes that both ideas function to pre-emptively neutralize attempts at refutation, and that they are especially used to delegitimize critical theory. The Cathedral allegedly "seeks to delude the American public" while amassing power and influence, and critical theory is portrayed as the ideological justification for the pursuit of power. Progressive thought is seen as a disguise for power-seeking, and Woods says that Yarvin takes advantage of the inability to prove the unconscious desires of others to argue that "everyone's primary motivation in life is their craving for greater power." El País compared the concept to QAnon and its claims of a deep state.

=== Racialism ===
Neoreactionaries endorse scientific racism, a pseudoscientific view which they refer to as "human biodiversity". Land coined the term "hyperracism" to refer to his views on race; he believes that socioeconomic status is "a strong proxy for IQ" rather than race specifically (though he acknowledges a correlation between race and socioeconomic status), and that meritocracy, particularly space colonization, will "function as a highly-selective genetic filter" that propagates mostly (but not strictly) Whites and Asians. Roger Burrows, writing for The Sociological Review, stated "In Land's schema, the consumers ‘exiting' from competing gov-corps quickly form themselves into, often racially based, microstates. Capitalist deterritorialization combines with ongoing genetic separation between global elites and the rest of the population resulting in complex new forms of ‘Human Bio-diversity'. He described Land's views as eugenicist and compared them to those of The Bell Curve.

According to Land, the concepts of hate speech and hate crimes are simply methods to suppress ideas that contradict the Cathedral's dogma. He says that statements described as "hate speech" are not related to hatred but are simply a type of defiance of the Cathedral's religious orthodoxy. The suppression is carried out by the "Media-Academic Complex" because the ideas are seen as reflecting a "heretical intention". Yarvin has stated, "Although I am not a white nationalist, I am not exactly allergic to the stuff", believing it to simply be an ineffective tool for "the very real problems about which it complains." Yarvin has endorsed arguments for black racial inferiority and says they are being suppressed by the Cathedral. He has said that some races are more suited to slavery than others and has been described as a modern-day supporter of slavery, a description he disputes.

=== Accelerationism ===
One of Land's goals with neoreactionarism is to drive accelerationism. Roger Burrows stated of Land's interpretation of Yarvin, "The Dark Enlightenment itself might be best thought of as the application of Land's accelerationist framework to Moldbug's neocameralism." Land views democratic and egalitarian policies as only slowing down acceleration and a technocapital singularity, stating "Beside the speed machine, or industrial capitalism, there is an ever more perfectly weighted decelerator ... comically, the fabrication of this braking mechanism is proclaimed as progress. It is the Great Work of the Left." Vincent Le states "If Land is attracted to Moldbug's political system, it is because a neocameralist state would be free to pursue long-term technological innovation without the democratic politician's need to appease short-sighted public opinion to be re-elected every few years."

Vox attributed such views to Land living in China's "techno-authoritarian political system" and his admiration for Deng Xiaoping and Singapore's Lee Kuan Yew. Land has referred to Lee as an "autocratic enabler of freedom", and Yarvin has also praised Lee. Yuk Hui considers sinofuturism to be a model for the movement's pursuit of technological progress which results from a perceived decline of the West. According to Hui, political fatigue leads people such as Land to look towards Asian cities such as Shanghai, Hong Kong, and Singapore as examples of "depoliticized techno-commercial utopia". China is viewed as smoothly importing Western science and technology while Western innovation is constantly limited by the progressivism of the Cathedral. Hui considers this to be "simply a detached observation of these places that projects onto them a common will to sacrifice politics for productivity". Land has advocated for accelerationists to support the neoreactionary movement, though many have distanced themselves from him in response to his views on race.

=== Formalism ===
In the inaugural article published on Unqualified Reservations in 2007, entitled "A Formalist Manifesto", Yarvin used the term "formalism" for his ideas, advocating for the formal recognition of the realities of existing power by aligning property rights with current political power as a solution to violence. Courtney Hodrick, writing for Telos, stated "in his view, all politics are individual property relationships and the social contract is an agreement between citizen-consumers and governor-owners. Your consent to an agreement such as 'I won't kill anyone on the street,' he explains, is 'just your agreement with whoever owns the street.' This agreement means that the owner of the street may use violence to enforce this agreement, just as individuals may use violence to defend their own property. His concern ... is deciding who has the monopoly on the legitimate use of violence. But rather than concern himself with justifying legitimacy politically or metaphysically, Moldbug calls for a naturalization of existing property relations." Yarvin describes the U.S. as "an big [sic] old company that holds a huge pile of assets, has no clear idea of what it's trying to do with them, and is thrashing around like a ten-gallon shark in a five-gallon bucket", advocating formalism as a solution:

"To a formalist, the way to fix the US is to dispense with the ancient mystical horseradish, the corporate prayers and war chants, figure out who owns this monstrosity, and let them decide what in the heck they are going to do with it. I don't think it's too crazy to say that all options—including restructuring and liquidation—should be on the table."

Yarvin rejects democracy as "ineffective and destructive" and attributes the successes of the post-World War II democratic system to its actually being "a mediocre implementation of formalism". He describes democratic politics as "a sort of symbolic violence, like deciding who wins the battle by how many troops they brought". Rejecting pacifism for what he perceives as a tendency to advocate for the rectification of injustices instead of seeking an end to armed conflict, Yarvin promotes the adoption of classical approaches to international law and the idea of "formalising the military status quo" as the most direct path to peace. He identifies the form of pacifism which prioritises "righteousness" instead of peace with the Calvinist doctrine of providence, and "ultracalvinism" as the ideological/theological basis for contemporary American interventionism.

== Relation to other movements ==
=== Seasteading ===
Prominent figures in the neoreactionary movement have connections to seasteading, the creation of sovereign dwellings in international waters, which has been characterized as a way to execute the movement's ideas. Yarvin has connections to Patri Friedman, founder of The Seasteading Institute and grandson of Milton Friedman, and Thiel was once its main investor. Thiel has also advocated the use of cyberspace, outer space, and the oceans to outstrip traditional politics via capitalism in order to realize libertarianism. Land has quoted Friedman in stating that "free exit is so important that…it [is] the only Universal Human Right".

=== The Network State ===
Balaji Srinivasan's proposal of the Network State, a plan for technology executives and investors to remove themselves from democracy and create their own sovereign states, has been compared to Yarvin's ideas. Journalists have described Srinivasan as a leader of the neoreactionary movement and a friend of Yarvin. Srinivasan had also messaged Yarvin suggesting potentially using the Dark Enlightenment audience to dox reporters. Comparisons have also been made to Galt's Gulch from Atlas Shrugged and Donald Trump's proposed "Freedom Cities". Supporters include Marc Andreessen, Garry Tan, Peter Thiel, Michael Moritz, Patrick Collison, Patri Friedman, Roger Ver, Naval Ravikant, Joe Lonsdale, Bryan Johnson, the Winklevoss twins, Sam Bankman-Fried, Sam Altman, Shervin Pishevar, Brian Armstrong, and Vitalik Buterin. Proposed cities alleged to be examples of the Network State include California Forever, Praxis, Telosa, Neom, Liberland, and Elon Musk's Starbase City. Established cities alleged to be part of the Network state include Próspera in Honduras and Itana in Nigeria. Other locations of interest include Greenland, French Polynesia, Palau, South Asia, Ghana, the Marshall Islands, Panama, the Bahamas, Montenegro, Costa Rica, and Rhode Island.

Cryptocurrency and Web3 are central components of the project. Its legal framework also involves special economic zones, and foreign investors have used Investor–state dispute settlement (ISDS) in the case of Próspera. The movement has been compared to Trumpism, with common ideologies including a belief in Strauss–Howe generational theory and hostility to left-wing politics, the news media and the administrative state. Critics have described these projects as a form of neocolonialism, corporate monarchy, or white saviorism. The Highland Rim Project, located in Tennessee and Kentucky, is a Christian nationalist community influenced by the Network State and was proposed by New Founding, a Christian venture capital firm that received funding from Andreessen and is connected to the Network State venture capital firm Pronomos Capital. The Guardian has noted the community's ties to far-right groups and white nationalism.

=== Surveillance capitalism ===
Mother Jones cites Clearview AI and its founder Hoan Ton-That (who were in connection with Thiel and Yarvin) as an example of the Dark Enlightenment or neoreactionary thinking's influence on the development of surveillance technology. A 2025 anonymous letter of a group of self-described former followers of the neoreactionary movement warned that the movement advocated for "techno-monarchism" in which its ruler would use "data systems, artificial intelligence, and advanced algorithms to manage the state, monitor citizens, and implement policies". It further warned that Musk, in the context of his actions at the Department of Government Efficiency, was working "for his own power and the broader neo-reactionary agenda." Yarvin has outlined a vision for San Francisco where public safety would be enforced by constant monitoring of residents and visitors via RFID, genotyping, iris scanning, security cameras, and transportation which would track its location and passengers, reporting all of it to the authorities. The New Republic described the proposed surveillance system as "Orwellian".

=== Alt-right ===
The Dark Enlightenment has been described by journalists and commentators as part of the alt-right, specifically as its theoretical branch. Journalist and pundit James Kirchick states that "although neo-reactionary thinkers disdain the masses and claim to despise populism and people more generally, what ties them to the rest of the alt-right is their unapologetically racist element, their shared misanthropy and their resentment of mismanagement by the ruling elites".

Scholar Andrew Jones wrote in 2019 that the Dark Enlightenment is the most significant political theory within the alt-right, and that it is "key to understanding" the alt-right political ideology. "The use of affect theory, postmodern critiques of modernity, and a fixation on critiquing regimes of truth", Jones remarked, "are fundamental to NeoReaction (NRx) and what separates it from other far-right theory". Moreover, Jones argues that Dark Enlightenment's fixation on aesthetics, history, and philosophy, as opposed to the traditional empirical approach, distinguishes it from related far-right ideologies. Historian Joe Mulhall, writing for The Guardian, described Land as "propagating very far-right ideas." Despite neoreaction's limited online audience, Mulhall considers the ideology to have "acted as both a tributary into the alt-right and as a key constituent part [of the alt-right]." Journalist Park MacDougald described neoreactionarism as providing a philosophical basis for considerable amounts of alt-right political activity.

The term "accelerationism", originally referring to Land's technocapitalist ideas, has been re-interpreted by some into the use of racial conflict to cause societal collapse and the building of white ethnostates, which has been linked to several white nationalist terrorist attacks such as the 2019 Christchurch mosque massacres. Vox described Land's shift towards neoreactionarism, along with neoreactionarism crossing paths with the alt-right as another fringe right wing internet movement, as the likely connection point between far-right racial accelerationism and the otherwise unrelated technocapitalist term. They cited a 2018 Southern Poverty Law Center investigation which found users on the neo-Nazi blog The Right Stuff who cited neoreactionarism as an influence. Land himself has called the neoreactionary movement "a prophetic warning about the rise of the Alt-Right".

=== Fascism ===
Journalists and academics have described the Dark Enlightenment as neo-fascist. University of Chichester professor Benjamin Noys described it as "an acceleration of capitalism to a fascist point". Nick Land disputes the similarity between his ideas and fascism, saying that "Fascism is a mass anti-capitalist movement", whereas he prefers that "capitalist corporate power should become the organizing force in society". Historians Angela Dimitrakaki and Harry Weeks tie the Dark Enlightenment to neofascism via Land's "capitalist eschatology" which they describe as supported by the supremacist theories of fascism. Dimitrakaki and Weeks say that Land's Dark Enlightenment was "infusing theoretical jargon into Yarvin/Moldbug's blog 'Unqualified Reservations'".

In The Sociological Review, Roger Burrows examined neoreaction's core tenets and described the ideology as "hyper-neoliberal, technologically deterministic, anti-democratic, anti-egalitarian, pro-eugenicist, racist and, likely, fascist", and describes the entire accelerationist framework as a faulty attempt at "mainstreaming ... misogynist, racist and fascist discourses". He criticizes neoreaction's racial principles and its brazen "disavowal of any discourses" advocating for socio-economic equality and, accordingly, considers it a "eugenic philosophy" in favor of what Nick Land deems "hyper-racism". Graham B. Slater wrote that this movement "aim[s] to solve the problems purportedly created by democracy through what ultimately amount to neo-fascist solutions."

Land himself became interested in the Atomwaffen-affiliated theistic Satanist organization Order of Nine Angles (ONA) which adheres to the ideology of Neo-Nazi terrorist accelerationism, describing the ONA's works as "highly-recommended" in a blog post. Art historian Sven Lütticken says that the popularity of Land's concepts has made certain art centers in New York and London hospitable to certain strains of authoritarianism.

== See also ==
- Accelerationism
- Libertarian authoritarianism – Political spectrum and theory
- Intellectual dark web – Commentators opposed to identity politics and political correctness
- Reactionary modernism – Political ideology characterized by embrace of technology and anti-Enlightenment thought
- Social Darwinism – Group of pseudoscientific theories and societal practices
- The Fourth Political Theory – 2009 book by Aleksandr Dugin
- Exit, Voice, and Loyalty – Book on economic and political theory

== Sources ==
- Tait, Joshua (2019). "Mencius Moldbug and Neoreaction". In Sedgwick, Mark (ed.). Key Thinkers of the Radical Right: Behind the New Threat to Liberal Democracy. Oxford University Press. pp. 187–203. ISBN 978-0190877606.
- Smith, Harrison; Burrows, Roger (2021). "Software, Sovereignty and the Post-Neoliberal Politics of Exit". Theory, Culture & Society. 38 (6): 143–166. doi:10.1177/0263276421999439. hdl:1983/9261276b-8184-482c-b184-915655df6c19. ISSN 0263-2764. S2CID 234839947.
