= American oligarchs =

American business tycoons with significant political influence

American oligarchs are wealthy business tycoons from the United States who possess significant political influence or close ties to the state. Scholars have said that the United States demonstrates characteristics of oligarchy, particularly in relation to the concentration of wealth and political influence among a small elite.

In 2014, a study by political scientists Martin Gilens of Princeton University and Benjamin Page of Northwestern University argued that the United States' political system does not primarily reflect the preferences of its average citizens. Their analysis of policy outcomes between 1981 and 2002 suggested that wealthy individuals and business groups held substantial influence over political decisions, often sidelining the majority of Americans.

== History ==
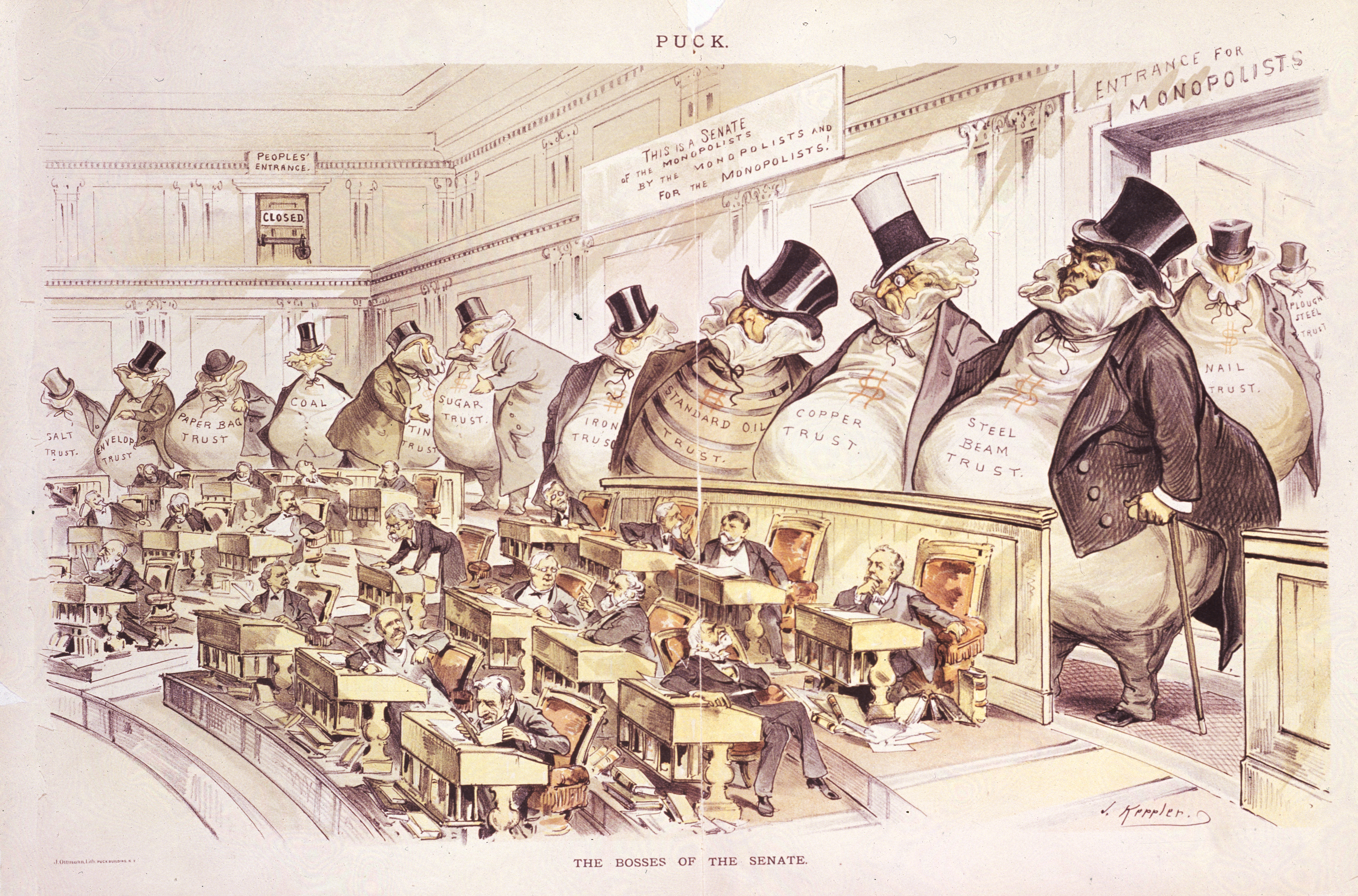
The Bosses of the Senate, corporate interests as giant money bags looming over senators

=== Progressive era ===
Attempts to prevent or abolish a state of American oligarchy were a central concern in the 1890s to 1920s progressive era.

=== Modern Era ===
==== Great Recession ====
Economist Simon Johnson argued that the rise of an American financial oligarchy became particularly prominent following the 2008 financial crisis. This financial elite has been described as wielding significant power over both the economy and political decisions. Former President Jimmy Carter in 2015 characterized the United States as an "oligarchy with unlimited political bribery" following the 2010 Citizens United v. FEC Supreme Court decision, which removed limits on donations to political campaigns.

In 2014, a study by political scientists Martin Gilens of Princeton University and Benjamin Page of Northwestern University argued that the United States' political system does not primarily reflect the preferences of its average citizens. Their analysis of policy outcomes between 1981 and 2002 suggested that wealthy individuals and business groups held substantial influence over political decisions, often sidelining the majority of Americans. The study noted that policy decisions are disproportionately influenced by economic elites. However, the study received criticism from other scholars, who argued that the influence of average citizens should not be discounted and that the conclusions about oligarchic tendencies were overstated. Gilens and Page defended their research, reiterating that while they do not label the United States an outright oligarchy, they found substantial evidence of economic elites dominating certain areas of policy-making.

==== Second Presidency of Donald Trump ====
The influence of American oligarchs received even greater attention. In a televised address, outgoing President Joe Biden warned the nation about the increasing dangers of oligarchy.

== See also ==
- Ruling class
- The Nerd Reich
