= Technolibertarianism =

Techno-political ideology rejecting all forms of government regulation

Technolibertarianism, sometimes referred to as cyberlibertarianism, is a political ideology with roots in the Internet's early hacker cypherpunk culture in Silicon Valley in the early 1990s and in American libertarianism.

The ideology focused on minimizing government regulation, censorship, or anything else in the way of a "free" World Wide Web. In this case, the word "free" is referring to the meaning of libre (no restrictions), not gratis (no cost). Cyber-libertarians embrace fluid, meritocratic hierarchies, which are believed to be best served by markets. The most widely known cyberlibertarian is Julian Assange.

The term technolibertarian was popularized in critical discourse by technology writer Paulina Borsook in her 2000 book, Cyberselfish: A Critical Romp Through the Terribly Libertarian Culture of High Tech. Others, like academic David Golumbia of Virginia Commonwealth University, explored the same topic in the context of cryptocurrency and right-wing politics.

In his book The Nerd Reich (2026), journalist Gil Duran argues that technolibertarianism was replaced by tech fascism with the rise of Peter Thiel, who distanced himself from libertarianism in 2009. According to Duran, the presidencies of Donald Trump embraced authoritarianism with the help and support of Silicon Valley. "For decades," Duran writes, "Silicon Valley had promoted libertarian fairy tales about freedom from government power. In fact, seizing that power for itself was the true goal."

== Notable proponents ==
- Julian Assange
- John Perry Barlow
- John Gilmore
- Elon Musk
- T. J. Rodgers
- Andrew Yang

== See also ==
- Broligarchy
- Censorship of Wikipedia
- Crypto-anarchism
- Free-culture movement
- Freedom of information
- Freedom of speech
- Information wants to be free
- Internet freedom
- Libertarian transhumanism
- Technocapitalism
- Technocracy
- The Californian Ideology
