= The Californian Ideology =

1995 essay on media theory and Silicon Valley politics

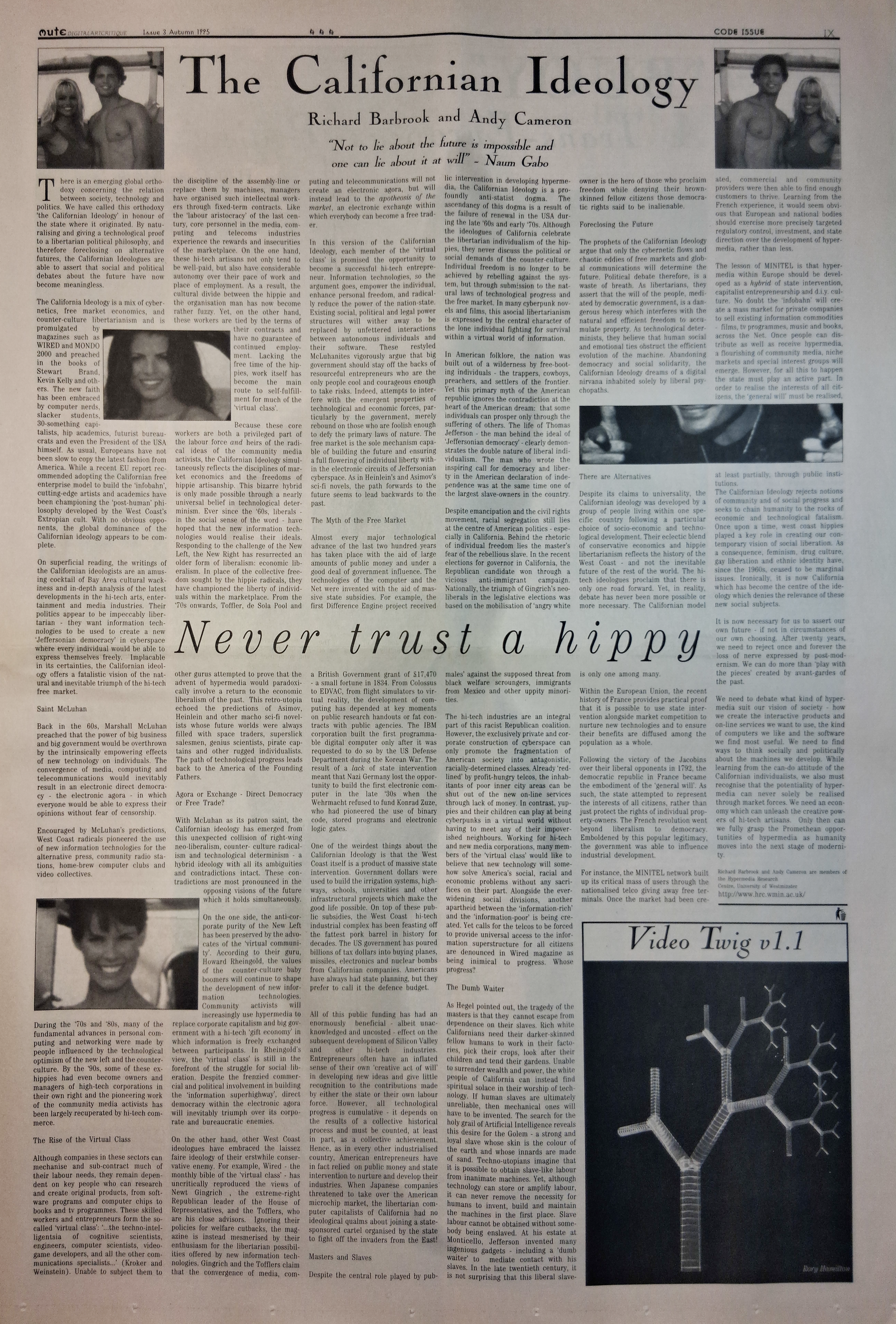
- Author: Andy Cameron and Richard Barbrook
- Publisher: Mute
- Publication date: 1995

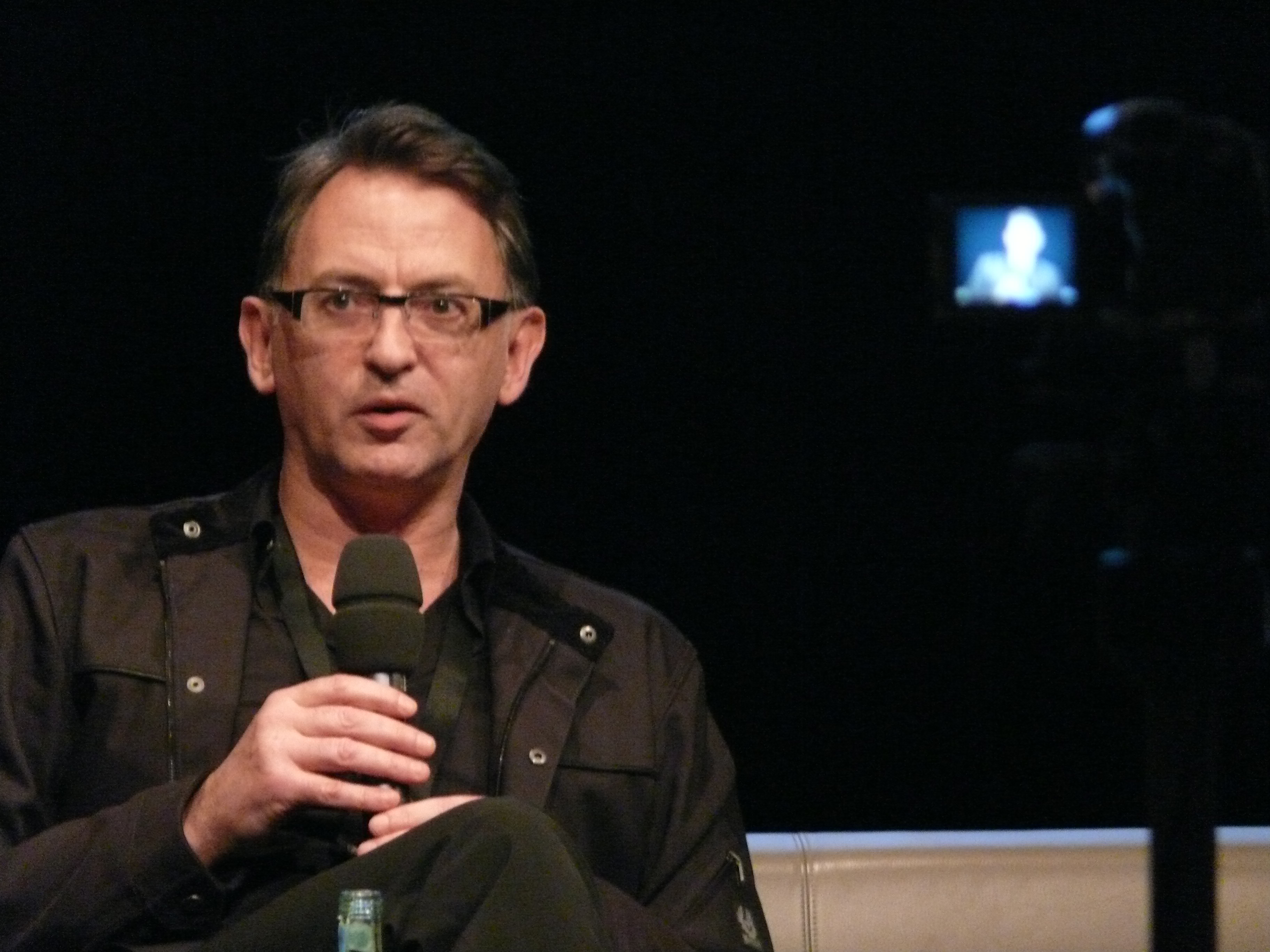
Andy Cameron in "Futurity Long Conversation"

"The Californian Ideology" is a 1995 essay by English media theorists Richard Barbrook and Andy Cameron of the University of Westminster. Barbrook calls it a "critique of dotcom neoliberalism". In the essay, Barbrook and Cameron argue that the rise of networking technologies in Silicon Valley in the 1990s was linked to American neoliberalism and a paradoxical hybridization of beliefs from the political left and right in the form of hopeful technological determinism.

The essay was published in Mute magazine in 1995 and later appeared on the nettime Internet mailing list. A revised version was published in Science as Culture in 1996. The essay has since been further revised and translated.

Andrew Leonard of Salon called the essay "one of the most penetrating critiques of neo-conservative digital hypesterism yet published". In contrast, Wired magazine publisher and Californian Louis Rossetto wrote that the essay showed "profound ignorance of economics".

== Critique ==
"This new faith has emerged from a bizarre fusion of the cultural bohemianism of San Francisco with the hi-tech industries of Silicon Valley...the Californian Ideology promiscuously combines the free-wheeling spirit of the hippies and the entrepreneurial zeal of the yuppies."

— Richard Barbrook and Andy Cameron

During the 1990s, members of the entrepreneurial class in the information technology industry in Silicon Valley vocally promoted an ideology that combined the ideas of Marshall McLuhan with elements of radical individualism, libertarianism, and neoliberal economics, using publications like Wired magazine to promulgate their ideas. This ideology mixed New Left and New Right beliefs based on their shared interest in anti-statism, the counterculture of the 1960s, and techno-utopianism.

Proponents believed that in a post-industrial, post-capitalist, knowledge-based economy, the exploitation of information and knowledge would drive growth and wealth creation while diminishing the older power structures of the state in favor of connected individuals in virtual communities.

Critics contend that the Californian Ideology strengthens corporations' power over the individual, increases social stratification, and is distinctly Americentric. Barbrook argues that members of the "digerati" (a portmanteau of "digi literati") who adhere to the Californian Ideology embrace a form of reactionary modernism. According to him, "American neo-liberalism seems to have successfully achieved the contradictory aims of reactionary modernism: economic progress and social immobility. Because the long-term goal of liberating everyone will never be reached, the short-term rule of the digerati can last forever."

== Influences ==
Sociologist Thomas Streeter of the University of Vermont has said that the Californian Ideology appeared as part of a pattern of Romantic individualism with Stewart Brand as a key influence. Adam Curtis connects the Californian Ideology's origins to Ayn Rand's philosophy of Objectivism.

== Reception ==
While generally agreeing with Barbrook and Cameron's central thesis, David Hudson of Rewired took issue with their portrayal of Wired magazine's position as representative of every viewpoint in the industry. "What Barbrook is saying between the lines is that the people with their hands on the reins of power in all of the wired world...are guided by an utterly skewed philosophical construct." Hudson maintained that there were a multitude of different ideologies at work.

Andrew Leonard of Salon called the essay "a lucid lambasting of right-wing libertarian digerati domination of the Internet" and "one of the most penetrating critiques of neo-conservative digital hypesterism yet published". Leonard also noted what he called former Wired editor and publisher Louis Rossetto's "vitriolic" response.

Rossetto's rebuttal, also published in Mute, criticized the essay as showing "profound ignorance of economics". He also criticized the essay's suggestion that "a uniquely European (but not even vaguely defined) mixed economy solution" would be better for the internet, arguing that Europe's technological development was hampered by "huge plutocratic organizations like Siemens and Philips [that conspire] with bungling bureaucracies to hoover up taxes collected by local and Euro-wide state institutions and shovel them into mammoth technology projects which have proven to be, almost without exception, disasters" and by "High European taxes which have restricted spending on technology and hence retarded its development".

Gary Kamiya, also of Salon, found the essay's main points valid, but, like Rossetto, attacked Barbrook's and Cameron's "ludicrous academic-Marxist claim that high-tech libertarianism somehow represents a recrudescence of racism. ('Following the L.A. riots, [white Californians] increasingly fear that [the] "underclass" will someday demand its liberation,' they intone. 'If human slaves are ultimately unreliable, then mechanical ones will have to be invented.' Uh, OK.)"

Architecture historian Kazys Varnelis of Columbia University found that in spite of the privatization the Californian Ideology advocates, Silicon Valley's and California's economic growth was "made possible only due to exploitation of the immigrant poor and defense funding...government subsidies for corporations and exploitation of non-citizen poor: a model for future administrations."

In the 2011 documentary All Watched Over by Machines of Loving Grace, Curtis concludes that the Californian Ideology failed to live up to its claims:

The original promise of the Californian Ideology, was that the computers would liberate us from all the old forms of political control, and we would become Randian heroes, in control of our own destiny. Instead, today, we feel the opposite—that we are helpless components in a global system—a system that is controlled by a rigid logic that we are powerless to challenge or to change.

In 2015, Wired wrote, "Denounced as the work of 'looney lefties' by Silicon Valley's boosters when it first appeared, The Californian Ideology has since been vindicated by the corporate take-over of the Net and the exposure of the NSA's mass surveillance programmes."

In 2022, Hasmet M. Uluorta and Lawrence Quill wrote, "The recent tech-lash, concerns over the gig-economy, and the dubious imperatives of datamining, require us to reconsider the prospects for open societies that rely upon platforms as we enter the next phase of the Californian Ideology."

== See also ==
- Paulina Borsook, Cyberselfish (2000)
- Carmen Hermosillo
- Corporatocracy
- Curtis Yarvin
- Cyber-utopianism
- Dark Enlightenment
- Dot-com company
- Intellectual property
- Libertarian transhumanism
- Surveillance capitalism
- Technocracy
- Technocapitalism
- Technolibertarianism
- TESCREAL
