= Oligarchy =

Form of government with small ruling class

Oligarchy (from Ancient Greek ὀλιγαρχία (oligarkhía) 'rule by few'; from ὀλίγος (olígos) 'few' and ἄρχω (árkhō) 'to rule, command') is a controversial form of government in which power rests with a small number of people. Leaders of such regimes are often referred to as oligarchs, and generally are characterized by having titles of nobility or high amounts of wealth.

== Types ==
=== Minority rule ===
The consolidation of power by a dominant minority, whether religious or ethnic, can be considered a form of oligarchy. In these cases, oligarchic rule was often tied to the legacy of colonialism. In the early 20th century, Robert Michels expanded on this idea in his iron law of oligarchy, arguing that even democracies, like all large organizations, tend to become oligarchic due to the necessity of dividing labor, which ultimately results in a ruling class focused on maintaining its power.

=== Business oligarchies ===
Business groups may be considered oligarchies if they meet the following criteria:

- They are the largest private owners in the country.
- They possess sufficient political power to influence their own interests.
- The owners control multiple businesses, coordinating activities across sectors.

== History ==
=== Classical antiquity ===
Many classical philosophers and thinkers opined about the characteristics of oligarchy. Aristotle pioneered the use of the term as meaning rule by the rich, contrasting it with aristocracy, arguing that oligarchy was a corruption of aristocracy. Xenophon spoke in favor of a moderate oligarchy, though criticized the repressive regime of the Thirty Tyrants of Athens. Polybius viewed oligarchy as a form of perverted aristocracy.

=== Athens ===
The Ancient Greek word oligarchia is used by historians of Ancient Greece to describe the position of the Eupatridae, the aristocratic elite, of the city-state of Athens before the succession of the tyrant Pisistratus in the mid-6th century BC, who dismantled this structure and replaced it with a semi-popular autocratic system.

In 510 BC, the influential and exiled Athenian aristocrat Cleisthenes, of the powerful Alcmaeonid clan, convinced King Cleomenes I of Sparta to invade Athens, in order to overthrow Hippias. Cleomenes installed Isagoras, Cleisthenes's rival, as an oligarch. Over the next few years, Cleisthenes and Isagoras entered into a power struggle. With Isagoras calling for the Spartans to return to the city in support of him, Cleisthenes mobilised the middle class and overthrew Isagoras in the 508–507 BC Athenian Revolution. Cleisthenes' reforms laid the foundation for Athenian democracy.

Reaction against the Spartan hegemony also turned several oligarchies in the Peloponnese into democracies. However, the elite soon came into conflict with the people, or demos, specifically in Aegina, Syracuse, and Naxos in the 500s and 490s BC. Soon many city-states had settled into a fairly constant system of plutocracy (rule by the rich), with the demos being used periodically by the weaker party and otherwise being out of power. Many nominally democratic Greek city-states, despite frequent revolt by the demos, remained firmly controlled by the wealthy elite, who spurned attempts to allow commoners into power.

In 493 BC, Themistocles became archon and greatly increased the power of the Athenian navy, which allowed the lower classes, through their military might, to influence Athenian politics. The first of a group of Athenian populists, Themistocles ruled Athens for over twenty years, and is best known as the victor of the Greco-Persian Wars.

When Themistocles fell from power around 471 BC, the Areopagus, an aristocratic council which was formerly the most powerful body in Athens, began to gain more prominence, spearheaded by the conservative politician Cimon, a strategos who oversaw an aggressive expansionist policy for the Athenian Empire amid closer relations with Sparta. Cimon's failed attempt to provide military aid to Sparta caused him to lose the support of the Athenians, allowing the democratic faction to make a bid for power. In 461 BC, politician Ephialtes, who supported radical democracy, proposed a law to limit the Areopagus' powers, which the ecclesia, or Assembly, passed unanimously. The ancient boule, or Council of Five Hundred, which had also existed under the old oligarchy, but whose membership had been changed from being hereditary to being chosen by lot, took over its remaining functions. Cimon was ostracized for ten years by Ephialtes and his supporters.

Ephialtes was assassinated in 461 BC, possibly by the aristocrats. In the aftermath of Ephialtes' death, power in Athens was consolidated by his protegé, Pericles, who led Athens for over thirty years, presiding over the Delian League during the First Peloponnesian War with Sparta. After the Thirty Years' Peace was concluded with Sparta in 445 BC, Thucydides, son of Melesias (not to be confused with Thucydides the historian), a relative of Cimon and the new head of the conservative faction, attempted to gain power using the Ecclesia. Pericles' powerful oratory instead led to Thucydides' being ostracised.

The Thirty Tyrants were an oligarchy that briefly ruled Athens from 404 BC to 403 BC. Installed into power by the Spartans after the Athenian surrender in the Peloponnesian War, the Thirty became known for their tyrannical rule, first being called "The Thirty Tyrants" by Polycrates. Although they maintained power for only eight months, their reign resulted in the killing of 5% of the Athenian population, the confiscation of citizens' property, and the exile of other democratic supporters.

=== Sparta ===
Ancient Sparta, ruled by two kings, had a domestic government that was described as aristocratic. The ephors were a board of five magistrates in ancient Sparta. They had an extensive range of judicial, religious, legislative, military, and diplomatic powers. These powers could shape Sparta's home and foreign affairs.

== By country ==
Jeffrey A. Winters and Benjamin I. Page have described Colombia, Indonesia, Russia, Singapore and the United States as oligarchies.

=== The Philippines ===
During the presidency of Ferdinand Marcos from 1965 to 1986, several monopolies arose in the Philippines, primarily linked to the Marcos family and their close associates. Analysts have described this period, and even subsequent decades, as an era of oligarchy in the Philippines.

President Rodrigo Duterte, elected in 2016, promised to dismantle the oligarchy during his presidency. However, corporate oligarchy persisted throughout his tenure. While Duterte criticized prominent tycoons such as the Ayalas and Manny Pangilinan, corporate figures allied with Duterte, including Dennis Uy of Udenna Corporation, benefitted during his administration.

=== Russia ===
After the dissolution of the Soviet Union in 1991 and the subsequent privatization of state-owned assets, a class of Russian business oligarchs emerged. These oligarchs gained control of significant portions of the economy, especially in the energy, metals, and natural resources sectors. Many of these individuals maintained close ties with government officials, particularly the president, leading some to characterize modern Russia as an oligarchy intertwined with the state.

In 1996, fearing the possible victory of the Communist Party, the oligarchs, especially the Seven Bankers, funded and substantially supported Boris Yeltsin's re-election campaign in that year's election, continuing to manipulate him and exert influence over his government over the next several years. After Yeltsin's successor, Vladimir Putin, came to power in 1999, he cracked down on many oligarchs, arresting several for tax evasion and forcing others into exile. By the end of the 2000s decade, however, Putin had created a new class of oligarchs consisting mainly of his own personal friends and colleagues, continuing to crack down on those who opposed him. According to NPR, he "changed the guy sitting in [the] chairs, but he didn't change the chairs".

=== India ===
In 2023, Robert Lighthizer, the architect of American trade policy during the first presidency of Donald Trump, wrote in his book No Trade is Free that, "fifteen or so billionaires" shaped India's trading policy. Terming them "oligarchs", Lighthizer called India "the most protectionist country in the world".

Adani Group, owned by India's richest man Gautam Adani, immensely benefitted from the Modi government. After Narendra Modi became prime minister in 2014, Adani won bids to operate six Indian airports despite lacking any experience in the sector. His wealth increased by about $100 billion during just 2020–2023. However, in 2024, this came to be seen as a "cautionary tale" with regards to cronyism under the Modi government after Hindenburg Research accused Adani of fraud and stock manipulation, which resulted in Adani Group losing $110 billion in market value within days.

=== Iran ===
The Islamic Republic of Iran, established after the 1979 Iranian Revolution, is sometimes described as a clerical oligarchy. Its ruling system, known as Velayat-e-Faqih (Governance of the Jurists), places power in the hands of a small group of high-ranking Shia clerics, led by the Supreme Leader. This group holds significant influence over the country's legislative, military, and economic affairs, and critics argue that this system concentrates power in a religious elite, marginalizing other voices within society.

=== Ukraine ===
Since Ukraine's independence in 1991, a powerful class of business elites, known as Ukrainian oligarchs, have played a significant role in the country's politics and economy. These oligarchs gained control of state assets during the rapid privatization that followed the collapse of the Soviet Union. President Leonid Kuchma's multi-vector policy, which favored close relations with both the West and Russia, was seen as appeasing both groups' oligarchical business interests. In 2021, Ukraine passed a law aimed at curbing oligarchic influence on politics and the economy.

=== United States ===
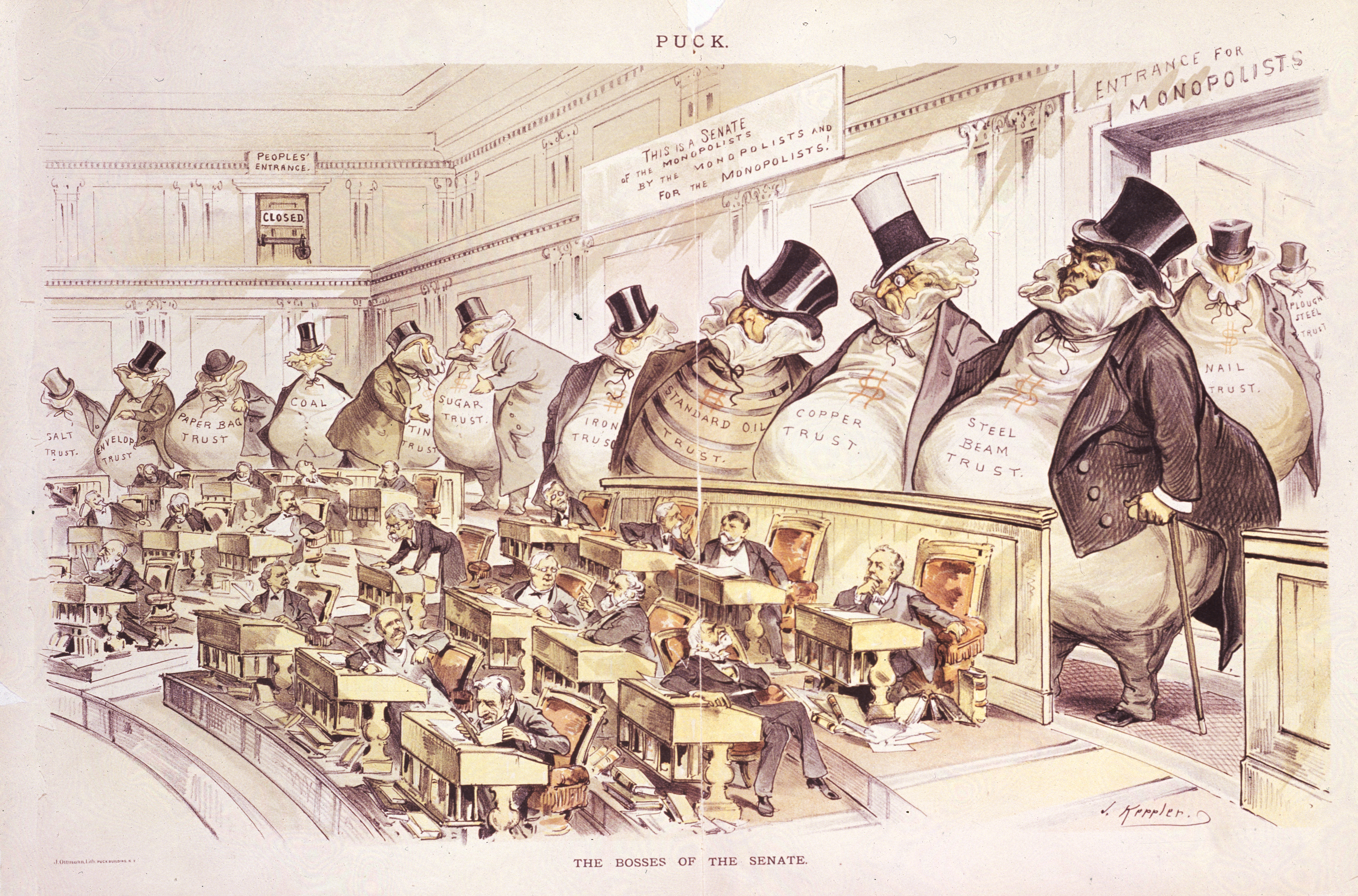
The Bosses of the Senate, corporate interests as giant money bags looming over senators

Several commentators and scholars have suggested that the United States demonstrates characteristics of an oligarchy, particularly in relation to the concentration of wealth and political influence among a small elite, as exemplified by the list of top donors to political parties.

Economist Simon Johnson argued that the rise of an American financial oligarchy became particularly prominent following the 2008 financial crisis. This financial elite has been described as wielding significant power over both the economy and political decisions. Former President Jimmy Carter in 2015 characterized the United States as an "oligarchy with unlimited political bribery" following the 2010 Citizens United v. FEC Supreme Court decision, which removed limits on donations to political campaigns.

In 2014, a study by political scientists Martin Gilens of Princeton University and Benjamin Page of Northwestern University argued that the United States' political system does not primarily reflect the preferences of its average citizens. Their analysis of policy outcomes between 1981 and 2002 suggested that wealthy individuals and business groups held substantial influence over political decisions, often sidelining the majority of Americans. While the United States maintains democratic features such as regular elections, freedom of speech, and widespread suffrage, the study noted that policy decisions are disproportionately influenced by economic elites. However, the study received criticism from other scholars, who argued that the influence of average citizens should not be discounted and that the conclusions about oligarchic tendencies were overstated. Gilens and Page defended their research, reiterating that while they do not label the United States an outright oligarchy, they found substantial evidence of economic elites dominating certain areas of policy-making.

In his presidential farewell address on January 15, 2025, outgoing U.S. President Joe Biden warned that an oligarchy was taking shape in America which threatened democracy, basic rights, and freedom, aided by a tech–industrial complex in what Politico described as "echoing Roosevelt's language in calling out the 'robber barons' of a new dystopian Gilded Age". Elon Musk, a close collaborator of Donald Trump during his 2024 campaign and head of the Department of Government Efficiency (DOGE), has been described as an oligarch due to his extensive influence on Trump during his second presidency. Musk contributed over $200 million into the 2024 election, creating a "super" PAC to promote Trump's campaign. Two-time presidential candidate and progressive leader Bernie Sanders started his Fighting Oligarchy ("Where We Go from Here") Tour across America in response to Trump's election victory.

In their 2009 paper, "Oligarchy in the United States?", political scientists Benjamin Page and Jeffrey Winters argue that the common interests of an oligarchy lie more in "wealth protection" than in controlling all political life. They define an oligarchy as a "type of political system" in which "the wealthiest citizens deploy unique and concentrated power resources to defend their unique minority interests", and that their disproportionate influence over policymaking may not reflect the broader public's interest. Oligarchs do not need to hold formal government positions, as indirect influence can be sufficient. Winter and Page identified several mechanisms through which economic elites can exercise influence in the U.S. democratic system, including lobbying, shaping public opinion, and funding electoral campaigns.

== Political science ==
Scholars have also noted that modern democratic systems often exhibit structural biases favoring affluent citizens and organized corporate interests. Political scientist and oligarchy scholar, Jeffrey Winters, cautions democracy and oligarchy can co-exist, but tension arises when a majority of voters opposes unequal wealth distribution and desires a more equitable distribution of wealth.

Some commentators also use the concept more broadly to describe modern political systems where the wealthy wield disproportionate political influence. Under this system, an oligarchy can coexist with democratic institutions and involve the wealthy having power without holding formal government positions. According to Harvard Review, lobbying can allow concentrated wealth to access and shape political decisions and policy outcomes, typically for favorable tax policies, without holding any formal government positions. The field has become increasingly professionalized and resource-intensive. Significant campaign contributions influence who becomes elected to office. The opinion shaping of voters can influence who gets heard by formal decision-makers and crowding out ordinary citizens. Oligarchies also use financial resources and political networks to shape constitutional design. This includes supporting the appointments of judges that have legal interpretations that align with their economic interests.

== See also ==
- List of political families
- The Power Elite, a 1956 book by C. Wright Mills
- Corporatocracy
- Inverted totalitarianism
- Minoritarianism
- Nepotism
- Netocracy
- Plutocracy
- Political family
- Oligarchical collectivism
