= Ruling class =

Social class that sets the rules of a society

In sociology, the ruling class of a society is the social class who set and decide the political and economic agenda of society.

In Marxist philosophy, the ruling class are the class who own the means of production in a given society and apply their cultural hegemony to determine and establish the dominant ideology (ideas, culture, mores, norms, traditions) of the society. In the case of the capitalist mode of production, that class is the capitalist class, also known as the bourgeoisie.

According to some theorists in the 21st century, the worldwide political economy established by neoliberalism and globalization has created a transnational capitalist class who are not native to any one country.

== Background ==
In previous modes of production, such as feudalism (inheritable property and rights), the feudal lords of the manor were the ruling class; in an economy based upon chattel slavery, the slave owners were the ruling class. The political economy of the feudal system gave socio-economic and legal power to the feudal lord over the life, labour, and property of the vassal, including military service. The political economy of a slave state gave the slaver socio-economic and legal power over the person, labour, and property of a slave.

In Marxist philosophy, the capitalist society has two dominant social classes: (i) the ruling-class bourgeoisie (capitalist class) who own the means of production as private property; and (ii) the working-class proletariat whom the bourgeoisie subject to the exploitation of labour, which form of political economy is justified by the dominant ideology of the ruling class. To replace the capitalist mode of production in a society, Marxism seeks to void the political legitimacy of the bourgeoisie as the ruling class and overthrow it and its state apparatus, replacing it with a state controlled by the working class, a worker's state, which abolishes private property and takes the means of production under its control. In Marxist theory, such a society, in which the proletariat has become the ruling class by seizing power and replacing the capitalist state institutions with institutions that serve the proletariat, is called a dictatorship of the proletariat. The ultimate goal of this worker's state is the abolition of classes and thus of class rule itself.

In the political economies of the former Marxist-Leninist states, the nomenklatura replaced the capitalist ruling class and control the means of production, allocate resources, etc. for the society, per the directions of the party. They were the administrators of the bureaucracy that executed the socio-economic functions of the state.

The sociologist C. Wright Mills identified and distinguished between the ruling class and the power elite who make the decisions for modern capitalist societies.

Likewise, to establish a society without social classes, anarchism seeks to abolish the ruling class. Unlike the Marxist perspective, anarchists, such as Mikhail Bakunin, seek to abolish the state, because, anarchists believe despite revolutionary change, the (capitalist) ruling class would be replaced by another ruling class (party leaders), which is a political cycle that voids the social-change purpose of a revolution.

Questioning the existence of a functional ruling class in 21st-century societies, Mattei Dogan proposes that the political and socio-economic elites do not form a cohesive ruling class within their societies because of the social stratification and the narrow specialisation of labour consequent to the globalization of the world economy. In contrast, for the 20th century, he identifies the combination of military defeat, political implosion and the presence of a charismatic leader as the drivers for the downfall of ruling classes in the Russian Empire, the Ottoman Empire, and later for the creation of Vichy France.

== See also ==
- American oligarchs
- Aristocracy
- Class consciousness
- Elite theory
- Epstein class
- Group decision-making
- Hegemony
- Liberal elite
- New class
- Nobility
- Nomenklatura
- Overclass
- The Man
- The Superclass List
- Totalitarianism
- Upper ten thousand
