= Transnational capitalist class =

Concept in Marxist theory

The transnational capitalist class (TCC) is a social class composed of individuals and groups who own, manage, or control transnational capital and whose economic interests, professional networks, and political influence operate primarily at the global rather than national level. The concept is most commonly associated with scholars of neoliberalism and globalization and international political economy who argue that, since the late 20th century, increasing cross-border integration of production, finance, technology, and governance has fostered the emergence of a globally-oriented elite, distinct from nationally-rooted capitalist classes.

== Members ==
Members of the TCC are typically identified as senior executives of multinational corporations and global financial institutions, leaders of transnational policy-planning bodies (e.g. World Economic Forum, World Trade Organization, International Monetary Fund, World Bank), and allied political, legal, and cultural intermediaries. Proponents of the concept contend that this class plays a significant role in shaping global economic rules, state policy, and ideological norms, while critics dispute its coherence, empirical basis, or explanatory power, arguing instead that national interests, state sovereignty, and inter-elite competition remain decisive.

== Historical development and factions ==
Until the 1960s, the capitalist class was studied mostly within the national context. Study from 1974 titled Global Reach: The Power of the Multinational Corporation by Ronald E. Muller and Richard Barnet started the discussion about multinational corporations and to what authors referred as “international corporate elite.”

According to Professor William I. Robinson it is "that segment of the world bourgeoisie that represents transnational capital". It is characteristically cosmopolitan and often unconstrained by national boundaries. The transnational capitalist class is expressed as a global ruling class and essential players of global capitalism by William I. Robinson and Jerry Harris.

Different factions within this class exist. Harris, for example, identifies statist-factions of the TCC in Russia, China, and the Persian Gulf. Various studies have examined the role of the TCC in Asia, Africa, the Caribbean, Europe, Latin America, the Middle East, North America, and Oceania.

Professor Leslie Sklair argues that the transnational capitalist class is made up of four factions which he identifies as corporate, state, technical and consumerist. The four factions stated by Professor Leslie Sklair, bring together transnational corporations (TNC), globalizing bureaucrats, globalizing professionals and merchants as well as the media as members of the TCC. Also according to Sklair's book Sociology of the Global System, the World Economic Forum (WEF) shows the existence of the TCC as the corporate faction and the state faction gather in Davos, Switzerland. The theory of the Transnational Capitalist Class has two main principles:

1. The transnational capitalist class collaborate to benefit their own interests (powerful lobbyists and super PACs);
2. Nation states have less control over transnational capitalist corporations aiding in globalization.

== Examples cited by sources ==
"Davos Man" is a neologism referring to the global elite of wealthy (predominantly) men, whose members view themselves as completely "international" and who despise the people of their own country, being loyal only to global capital itself. According to political scientist Samuel P. Huntington, who is credited with inventing the phrase "Davos Man", they are people who "have little need for national loyalty, view national boundaries as obstacles that thankfully are vanishing, and see national governments as residues from the past whose only useful function is to facilitate the élite's global operations". In his 2004 article "Dead Souls: The Denationalization of the American Elite", Huntington argues that this international perspective is a minority elitist position not shared by the nationalist majority of the people.

Ian Richardson sees the Bilderberg group as the transnational power elite, "an integral, and to some extent critical, part of the existing system of global governance", that is "not acting in the interests of the whole".
