= In Formation (magazine) =

Technology and culture magazine

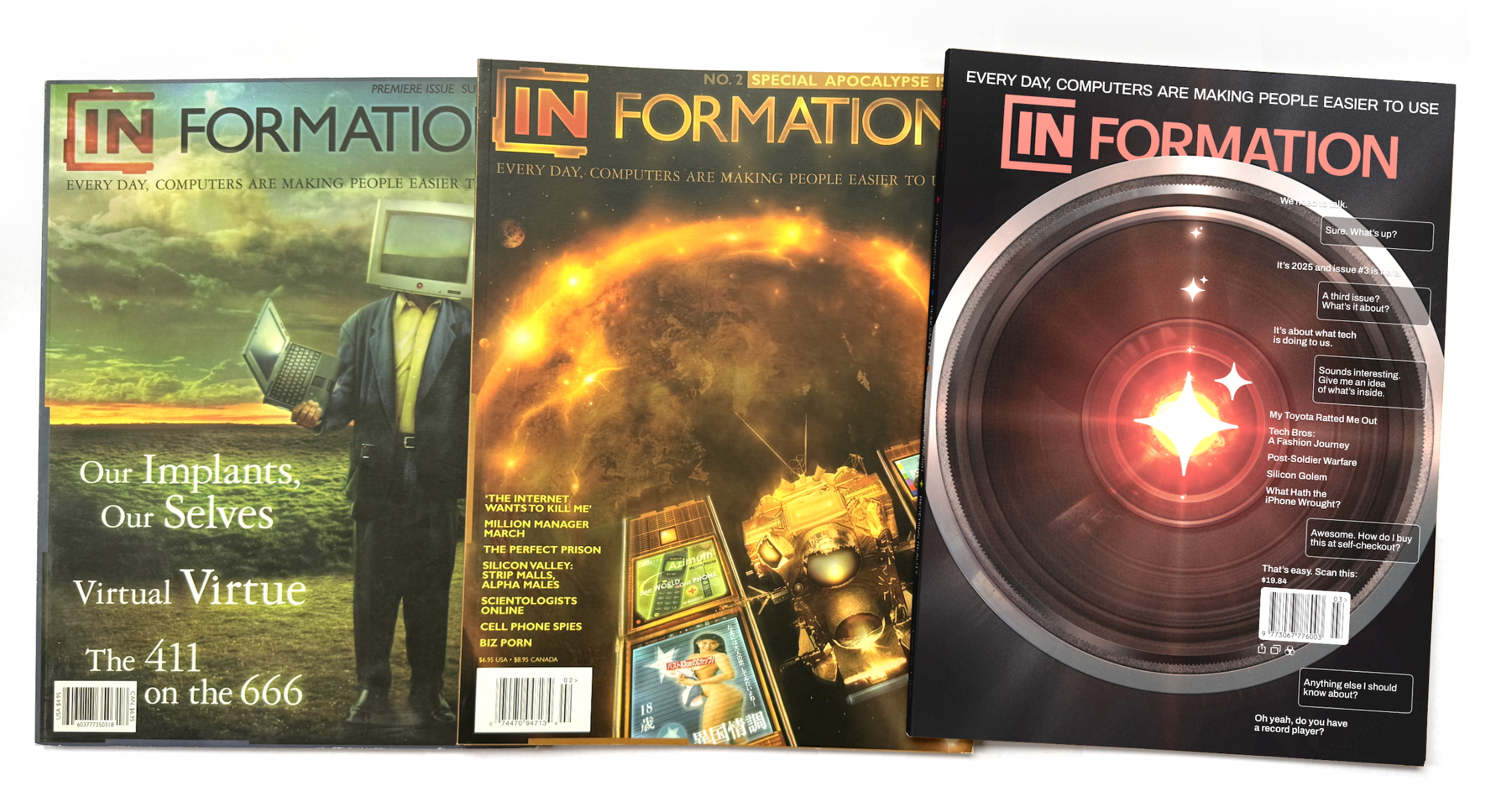
- Covers of the 1998, 2000, and 2025 issues
- Categories: Technology, Culture
- Frequency: Irregular
- Founder: David Temkin
- First issue: June 1998; 27 years ago
- Country: United States
- Based in: San Francisco, U.S.
- Website: informationmagazine.com
- ISSN: 3067-7769

In Formation is a print magazine based in San Francisco that focuses on the impact of technology on society. Its tagline is "Every Day, Computers are Making People Easier to Use," and it explores themes on the subject of "what tech is doing to us." It includes reporting, analysis, parody, and satire focused on technology and Silicon Valley culture. Its official website is informationmagazine.com.

== History ==
The magazine was founded and first published in 1998 by David Temkin, a software engineer, who was joined by Alex Lash, Brian Maggi, Paulina Borsook, Oren Tversky, Ty Ahmad-Taylor, Scott D. Wilson and other technologists, designers, cultural critics and tech journalists. A second issue, the "Special Apocalypse Issue" was published in 2000. The magazine was described by The New York Times as "the anti-Wired" because of its technology-skeptical stance. The Wall Street Journal described it as “taking a jaundiced view of technology."

The magazine was sold in US retail chains including Barnes & Noble, Borders, Tower Publications, and CompUSA. According to Wired, CompUSA removed copies of In Formation from its shelves in 1999 because CompUSA believed the magazine's content did not align with the store's corporate image.

== 2025 Revival ==
In Formation was revived in 2025 by its original editors and a new design team led by Josh Klenert, the magazine’s creative director, and a set of new writers and editors, including Jon Callas and Miles Pomper. The third issue is oversize (9”x12”), with 160 pages. The relaunch was accompanied by a new official website, informationmagazine.com, which hosts content, information on contributors, and purchase information.

== Contributors ==
Earlier issues contain essays from Theodore Roszak, Nick Wingfield, and Liz Dunn. The 2025 issue includes contributions from Richard Gingras, Norman Meyrowitz, Eugene S. Robinson, and David Kamp, as well as articles from current and former employees of Apple, Meta, and Google.
