= Freedom Cities =

2023 proposal by Donald Trump

The proposal calls for building on federal land, much of which is managed by the Bureau of Land Management.

Freedom Cities is a concept proposed by Donald Trump for developing up to ten new master-planned cities on federal land in the United States. The proposal was introduced as part of his 2024 presidential campaign and involves holding a contest to award development rights to private entities.

The vision for Freedom Cities combines goals of increasing housing supply, revitalizing American industry, and promoting a specific social and aesthetic vision. The project has been developed further by conservative and libertarian think tanks, which have identified potential locations and drafted model legislation. The proposal has drawn both support from proponents of deregulation and criticism from academics, urban planners, and environmental groups over its political ideology, feasibility, and potential impact on democracy and the environment.

== Concept and proposal ==
=== Initial announcement ===
Donald Trump first announced the Freedom Cities proposal in a campaign video on March 3, 2023. He called for a "quantum leap in the American standard of living" and framed the project as a return to the nation's ambitious, frontier-settling past, comparing it to the development of the transcontinental railroad and the Interstate Highway System.

The core of the proposal involves:

- Chartering up to ten new cities, roughly the size of Washington D.C., on a 0.06% of the 640 million acres of land owned by the federal government.
- Holding a contest to select the best development proposals from the public and private sectors.
- Reigniting American manufacturing by creating "hives of industry" to reduce reliance on imports from China.
- Promoting homeownership for young and working-class families as a core part of the "American Dream".

=== Technological and social vision ===
The proposal also includes futuristic and socially conservative elements. Trump advocated for U.S. leadership in the development of vertical take-off and landing (VTOL) vehicles for families and individuals, aiming to revolutionize transportation.

Socially, the plan aims to engineer a "new baby boom" by providing baby bonuses to encourage family formation. This is complemented by a "great modernization and beautification campaign" to replace "ugly buildings" with neo-classical architecture, reflecting an executive order issued during Trump's first term that promoted traditional designs for federal buildings, which was panned by critics for discouraging modern ideas in design.

== Proponents and legislative framework ==
Following Trump's announcement, several conservative and libertarian organizations and individuals began to flesh out the proposal. Key proponents include the American Enterprise Institute (AEI), the Charter Cities Institute, the Frontier Foundation, and the Freedom Cities Coalition, an advocacy group connected to Próspera and created by NeWay Capital LLC. The concept is also supported by tech billionaires such as Peter Thiel, Marc Andreessen and Joe Lonsdale.

=== Homesteading 2.0 ===
In April 2025, the AEI's Housing Center published "Homesteading 2.0", a blueprint that identified potential sites for 20 new cities and 3 million homes on federal land. The plan calls for selling a total 850 square miles of Bureau of Land Management (BLM) land and it consists of two main initiatives:

- Home Sweet Home: Selling 250 square miles of BLM land near existing cities to build 1.5 million new homes.
- Freedom Cities: Selling 600 square miles of BLM land to create approximately 20 new cities, which would also contain 1.5 million homes in total, built out over a 40-50 year timeline.

The AEI created an interactive map highlighting areas near existing metropolitan centers in the American West as prime locations, including the outskirts of:

- Las Vegas, Nevada
- Grand Junction, Colorado
- Salt Lake City, Utah
- Bend, Oregon
- Boise, Idaho

=== Proposed legal framework ===
A draft of the Freedom Cities Act, authored by Chapman University law professor Tom W. Bell, outlines a detailed legal pathway for these jurisdictions. Under this model legislation, Freedom Cities would be established as "federal enclaves" with significant exemptions from federal laws and regulations. A board composed of representatives from the departments of Commerce, Treasury, and Interior would have the authority to approve development applications and waive regulations.

Other suggested legal pathways include the creation of "interstate compacts", in which two or more states would agree to form a special territory with shared rules that would then be approved by Congress, or the use of direct executive orders by the president to establish each new city individually.

== Analysis and criticism ==
=== Regulatory exemptions ===
A central feature of the proposal is providing "regulatory relief" to spur innovation and development. According to draft legislation, these cities could be exempt from major federal laws, including:

- The Internal Revenue Code
- The Clean Water Act and the Endangered Species Act
- The Fair Labor Standards Act and the Occupational Health and Safety Act (OSHA)

Proponents envision each city becoming a hub for a specific industry, such as semiconductors, defense, biotechnology, or nuclear power, all operating without prior approval from agencies like the FDA or the EPA, creating high tech company towns. Critics, however, warn that removing environmental and labor protections could lead to exploitation and ecological damage with few legal remedies for residents or neighboring regions.

=== Feasibility and infrastructure ===
Beyond political opposition, practical concerns have been raised. Building residential housing on federal land is not unprecedented, as seen in a 2024 Clark County, Nevada, purchase of 20 acres of BLM land for 210 affordable homes. However, critics note that creating entire cities from scratch on the vast, remote tracts of BLM land presents immense logistical challenges, particularly regarding water access.

=== Governance and democracy ===
Critics argue that the proposed governance model would create undemocratic, corporate-run entities. The draft legislation suggests that residents of Freedom Cities would be prohibited from voting in state elections, and the cities would be operated and maintained by the developers who won the initial bid. Political consultant Gil Duran predicted these would be "cities where the owners [...] have all the power and everyone else has no power."

Max Woodworth, an urban geographer at Ohio State University, compares the concept to authoritarian city-building projects abroad, suggesting they are "specifically designed to short-circuit any kind of democratic process [...] in favor of making top-down corporate structures that masquerade as cities".

==== Ideological foundations ====
Academic analysis has focused on the ideological motivations behind the proposal. Woodworth argues that Freedom Cities represent a form of reactionary urbanism rooted in a nostalgic and exclusionary vision of America. He connects the proposal's rhetoric—particularly its references to the "frontier"—to a history of settler colonialism and "racial cleansing". In this view, the plan is not just about building new cities but about creating exclusive enclaves that materially manifest a political agenda. The emphasis on intensive policing and the desire to abandon and create alternatives to existing diverse cities are seen as efforts to build "a sanitized mirror-image of existing cities" for a select population.

Georgetown University professor Jodi Vittori builds on this by linking the movement to crypto-utopians and far-right accelerationists who seek to hasten the collapse of the current governing system to replace it with a new, hierarchical one. She cites the work of figures like Curtis Yarvin, who advocates for an "alternative regime" run by an unaccountable CEO, a vision that an advisor to the Department of Government Efficiency (DOGE) described as a "crisp articulation" of their goals. In this context, Freedom Cities are seen as a vehicle for a radical political project aimed at destroying existing institutions. She also analyzes the Freedom Cities proposal within a broader framework she terms "ungoverning"—a deliberate attack on the capacity and legitimacy of the administrative state. She connects the concept to historical and contemporary examples of leaders dismantling their own government's institutions for ideological or corrupt purposes. She further argues that the push for Freedom Cities aligns with a form of warlordism, not in the sense of literal civil war, but in the creation of corporate-governed fiefdoms that operate outside of the established legal and regulatory system. These "start-up cities" or special economic zones, like Próspera, are designed to allow residents and corporations to "exit" the existing system of liberal democracy in favor of a "marketplace of alternatives".

In April 2025, Paul Dans, the former head of the conservative transition plan Project 2025, has described the Freedom Cities proposal as part of Donald Trump's "construction phase" that would follow his "demolition" of the administrative state.

== See also ==
- Agenda 47
- Charter city (economic development)
- Dark Enlightenment
- Free State Project
- Personal air vehicle
- Próspera
- Special economic zone
- The Network State
