= Reactionary modernism =

Political ideology

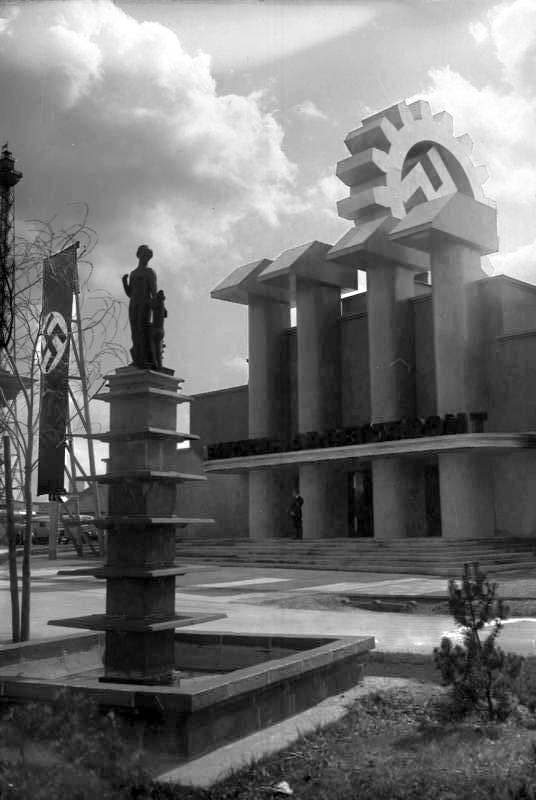
Nazi German architecture mixing modernist design with the ancient Swastika symbol

Reactionary modernism (also referred to as Alternative Modernism) is a term coined by Jeffrey Herf in the 1980s to describe the mixture of "great enthusiasm for modern technology with a rejection of the Enlightenment and the values and institutions of liberal democracy" that was characteristic of the German Conservative Revolution and Nazism. In turn, this ideology of reactionary modernism was closely linked to the original, positive view of the Sonderweg, which saw Germany as the great Central European power, neither of the West nor of the East.

== Overview ==
Herf's application of the term to describe fascism has been widely echoed by other scholars. Herf had used the term to denote a trend in intellectual thought during the era, what German novelist Thomas Mann had described as "a highly technological romanticism" during the interwar years. Herf used the term in reference to a wide range of German cultural figures, including Ernst Jünger, Oswald Spengler, Carl Schmitt, and Hans Freyer.

Raphael Costa argues that fascism is a modernist movement, as its desire for revolutionary and total projects to remake society could only have emerged in the early 20th century when society and culture were permeated with modernist meta-narratives of cultural renewal. Fascism, in the words of historian Modris Eksteins, "was a desire to create mankind anew." David Roberts, in his 2016 book Fascist Interactions, argues that "by now it is widely held that fascism was not some revolt against modernity but the quest for an alternative modernity."

== In various eras ==
=== Interwar Europe ===
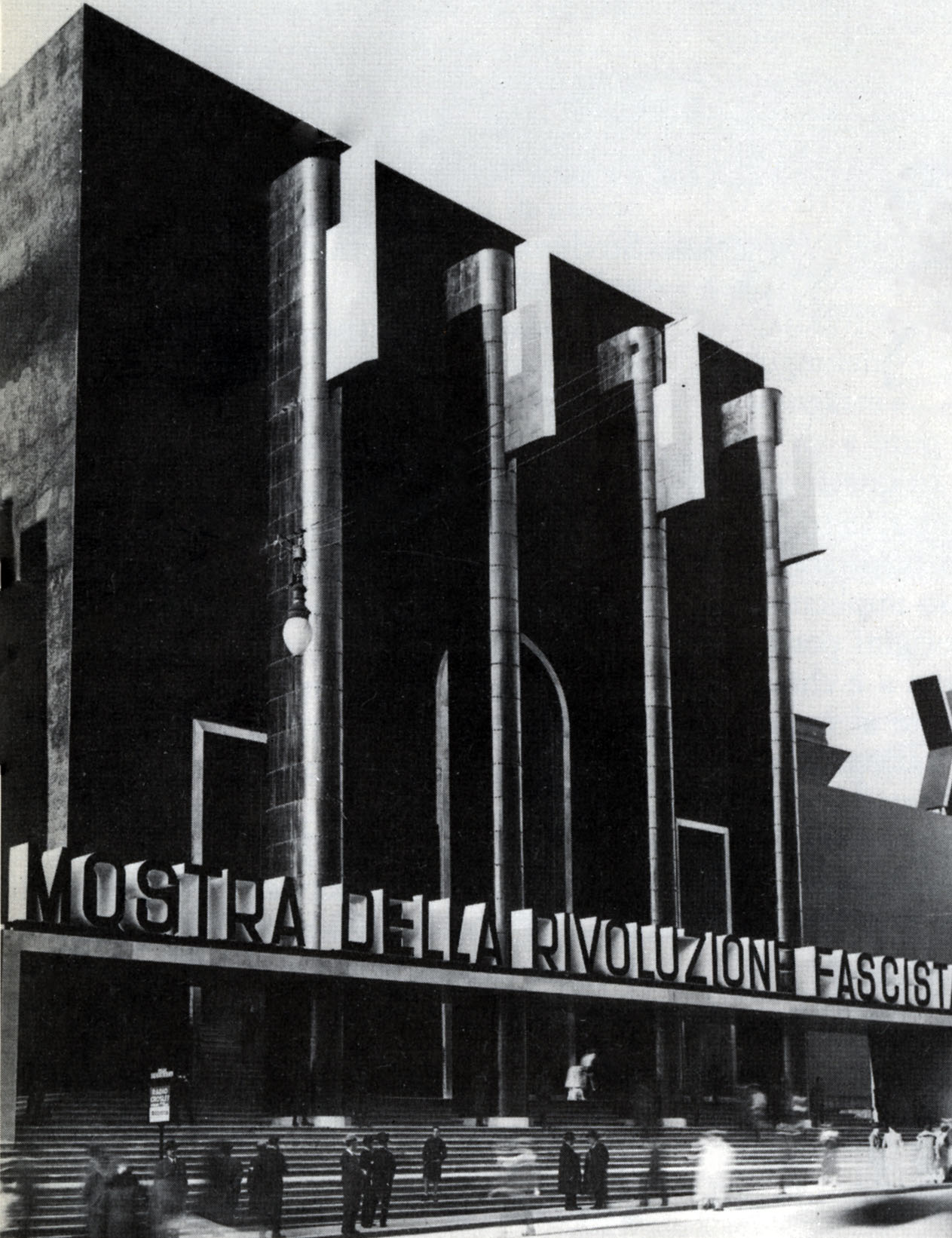
The 1932 Exhibition of the Fascist Revolution in Rome is a prime example of 'reactionary modernism', combining avant-garde, functionalist design with archaic, authoritarian myths.

Since Herf created the neologism, it has gained mainstream currency with historians in discussing the paradoxical European enthusiasm for paternalistic authoritarianism and volkish nationalism on the one hand, and new technological and political concepts on the other hand, all under totalitarian regimes.

Reactionary modernism has been explored as a theme in the interwar literature and broader political culture of Great Britain. It has been examined in the context of other European countries during the interwar period, including Romania, Greece, Sweden, and Spain. It has even been examined in the context of fascism in Japan. Other historians acknowledge the term's recognition of an influential trend in European philosophical, cultural and political thought during the period when fascism was on the rise. Historian Nicolas Guilhot has broadened the scope of reactionary modernism, applying the term to trends in Weimar Republic industry, medicine (eugenics), mass politics, and social engineering. Reactionary modernism can be seen in the fascist concept of the New Man, as well as in art movements of Weimar culture that emphasized rationalism and embraced Futurism and the New Objectivity. Many Weimar period artists rejected the Futurists' fetishization of machinery and violence, for example the proponents of German Expressionism. Despite this, the return to order became a dominant theme in German culture and in that of other European countries.

=== Present day ===
Herf now applies the term to claim similarity to the governments of Iran under the Ayatollahs, the government of Iraq under Saddam Hussein, and extremist Islamist groups such as Al Qaeda. Other scholars, including Paul Berman, have also applied Herf's term to radical Islamism.

Cultural critic Richard Barbrook argues that members of the digerati, who adhere to the Californian Ideology, embrace a form of reactionary modernism which combines economic growth with social stratification.

== Criticism of Herf's conceptualization ==
Thomas Rohkrämer criticized the concept of reactionary modernism, arguing

It is simply not strange or 'paradoxical to reject the Enlightenment and embrace technology at the same time', but a common practice in nineteenth- and twentieth-century Germany as well as in many other countries. Instrumental reason and technology are available for an endless number of different purposes, many of which are not humane or enlightened.

Support for this view also came from Roger Griffin, who argued

fascism as an ideology and movement can be seen as proposing a radical alternative to liberal and socialist visions of what form modernity ideally should take. It represents an uncompromising rejection both of thorough-going liberalism and extreme 'modernism', whose logical culmination it sees as relativism, anomie, subjectivism, and the loss of definitive meaning and 'eternal' values. It is an attempt to re-anchor modern human beings within that highly modern phenomenon, the totalitarian state (a term used positively by Fascism) through consciously manipulated historical, national and racist myth (all deeply modern ideological constructs).

== See also ==
- Dark Enlightenment
- Fascism
- Metamodernism
- Retrofuturism
- Revolt Against the Modern World (Julius Evola)
- Guillaume Faye
- Metaxism
