= Regimes of truth =

Philosophy term coined by Michel Foucault

Regimes of truth is a term coined by philosopher Michel Foucault, referring to a discourse that holds certain things to be "truths". Foucault sought to explore how knowledge and truth were produced by power structures of society.
