= David Golumbia =

American academic and author (1963–2023)

- Born: 1963; Detroit, Michigan, U.S.
- Died: September 14, 2023 (aged 59–60); Richmond, Virginia, U.S.

Academic work
- Institutions: Virginia Commonwealth University
- Main interests: Cyberlibertarianism

David Alan Golumbia (1963 – September 14, 2023) was an American academic and author. From 2010 to his death he was a professor at Virginia Commonwealth University. His research focused on "cyberlibertarianism, bitcoin, blockchain, and the logic of computing".

He had been selected to be a co-editor of Boundary 2 to succeed Paul Bové but died from an aggressive form of abdominal cancer before he could take up that role.

== Bibliography ==
=== Books ===
- Golumbia, David (2009). The Cultural Logic of Computation. Harvard University Press. ISBN 9780674032927.
- Golumbia, David (2016). The Politics of Bitcoin: Software as Right-Wing Extremism. University of Minnesota Press. ISBN 9781517901806.
- Golumbia, David (2024). Cyberlibertarianism: The Right-Wing Politics of Digital Technology. University of Minnesota Press. ISBN 9781517918149.

=== Articles ===
- Golumbia, David (March 2018). "Zealots of the Blockchain". The Baffler. No. 38.
