= Praxis (company) =

Company that plans to create a city

- Predecessor: Bluebook Cities
- Founded: 2019
- Founder: Dryden Brown and Charlie Callinan
- Headquarters: New York, NY
- Key people: David Weinreb
- Website: praxisnation.com

Praxis is a company founded by Dryden Brown, Charlie Callinan, and David Weinreb. Praxis has stated plans to create a 10,000 population city, first in the Mediterranean, then in Greenland, then in Uruguay.

== History ==
=== Founders and formation ===
Dryden Brown was raised in Santa Barbara, California and was homeschooled in order to pursue competitive surfing. He stated that as a high schooler, he studied Ayn Rand and Austrian economists, and when he applied for college, he limited his applications to Harvard University, Stanford University, the University of Oxford, and the University of Cambridge. He was rejected by them all and he attended New York University before dropping out. Before founding Praxis, Brown worked as an analyst for a hedge fund, where he met Praxis co-founder Charlie Callinan, a former Boston College wide receiver. Brown was fired from the hedge fund. In 2019, Brown and Callinan used money Callinan won in a golf tournament to travel to Nigeria and Ghana, where they met with Ghana's Vice President Mahamudu Bawumia and proposed building a financial center. In 2019, a conversation while surfing in Puerto Rico inspired Callinan and Brown to establish a company called Bluebook Cities.

The New York Times writes that Praxis founder Dryden Brown "isn’t a charismatic speaker or an accomplished businessman" and that he is "big on promises and light on specifics". In 2022, Brown told a speechwriter that his inspiration for Praxis came when he saw people looting stores in SoHo during the George Floyd protests. Following the protests, he rented a cabin in Alaska. Brown has lamented the organization of modern cities and their perceived lack of shared values.

A former Praxis employee said Brown's "ideal governance is authoritarian fascism—without religion—and instead the state party is holding everything together." Another former employee described Brown's outlook in the same Mother Jones article: “Dryden very strongly believes there is a natural order. And that there’s a reason why society looks like it does. In his eyes, it’s because God wants it to look that way. He genuinely believed that Black people are not as smart as white people.”

=== Early investments ===
A December 2023 report in The New York Times revealed that Brown had raised $19.2 million for Praxis. Praxis’ largest backer is Paradigm Operations. Other investors include Pronomos Capital, backed by Peter Thiel and first led by Patri Friedman, grandson of Milton Friedman, as well as venture capitalists Balaji Srinivasan and Palantir co-founder Joe Lonsdale, both associates of Peter Thiel. In addition, Praxis received investments from Alameda Research, backed by Sam Bankman-Fried, Apollo Projects, launched by Sam Altman, and Winklevoss Capital Management, the family office of the Winklevoss twins.

=== Praxis loft location ===
In May 2022, Praxis moved into a large, top-floor office in SoHo where Praxis staff members live and work. The loft is the location of some of Praxis's lavish parties, where Brown attempts to "evoke the salon culture of the Parisian Enlightenment." Other parties have occurred in bars and the Yale Club of Manhattan. By 2022, six staff members were living in the Praxis loft. In February 2024, Praxis was sued by the loft owner for failing to pay rent.

=== Scouting and fundraising ===
Although original Praxis plans included development in the Mediterranean Sea, the company also explored Greenland as a site. In November 2024, Zetland reported that Brown had traveled to Greenland and spoken with Greenlandic politicians about the project, e.g. Pele Broberg.

In October 2024, Brown said Praxis had received $525 million in milestone-based financing, and that financing at GEM Digital would become possible after Praxis listed crypto tokens on a public exchange. In April 2025, Bloomberg reported that Praxis CEO Dryden Brown was scouting a location to build, looking for at least 10,000 acres (4,000 ha). At that point, the organization had raised around $500 million from investors. The plan entailed building a city "that will offer AI-augmented governance, an environment that will accelerate tech research and employer-friendly labor laws he describes as "Elon-compatible". He outlined a plan to move supporters into 250 to 1000 modular houses, after the host country's support had been secured. Later, it outlined a plan to build a larger city based on a design by Zaha Hadid Architects.

In June 2025, Vanity Fair reported that Brown had stated he had selected a location in California to build Praxis, as a new city named Atlas about an hour north of Santa Barbara. Atlas would be at Vandenberg, according to Brown, which is a US Space Force base with around 3,000 military personnel and their families. Brown described the site as a "Jetsons/pioneer/1950s/space-futurism insane city on federal land. It is a revival of the aesthetic, classical ideas in America. It is a high-testosterone futuristic vision versus the chill, community-oriented one." By December 2025, Atlas was described as a "defence-focused spaceport city". Brown also talked of wanting to establish a non-US city in 2026, as a place for "tech elites" to go to if the US political environment became less tech friendly.

=== Partnership with +Colonia and planned construction ===
In September 2026, Praxis signed a deal to build a city in Uruguay. The project is planned to be part of the +Colonia smart city at the Rio de la Plata coast near Colonia del Sacramento. On September 22, 2026, Praxis announced that it had signed a deal with +Colonia to facilitate the gradual buildup of Praxis' planned community within +Colonia. The deal dictates that Praxis will purchase land from +Colonia in late 2027. Brown has stated he plans to move to Uruguay in December 2026. Construction of +Colonia has been underway since September 2026.

== Membership and economy ==
Brown said the waiting list for the proposed city was 50,000 people long and that 12,000 members were interested in moving starting in 2026. The Praxis team recruits new members in cities like Los Angeles, the Bay Area, Miami and at conventions such as Coachella and Cannes. Membership includes founders of Worldcoin and Soylent.

== Values ==
Flag of the digital nation of Praxis

In a 2021 interview, Brown said the city's style would be "hero futurism" with a "neo-Gilded Age kind of aesthetic". According to Vanity Fair, Brown has "long been inspired" by Galt's Gulch, Ayn Rand's capitalist utopia. The Praxis organization is associated with libertarianism and cryptocurrency. In the company's Series A pitch to investors in 2022, it called its proposed city a "cryptostate".

An internal Praxis branding guide accessed by The New York Times denounced "enemies of vitality," and extolled the "traditional, European/Western beauty standards on which the civilized world, at its best points, has always found success." The document revealed an interest in attracting "hot girls" and tech talent.

Employees at Praxis received a welcome packet containing recommendations for books that openly promote racism and fascism. An internal Praxis slideshow highlighted traditionalist writer Julius Evola's "thinking on the four “functional classes” or castes, and suggested the categories should guide the company's recruitment of new members and prospective residents."

Critics say that Praxis or any other network state is nothing more than a "libertarian utopia with minimal corporate regulation" for those "economically and eugenically select few" who want to live in a place without "regulatory oversight or financial checks" that explicitly prioritizes capital over democracy and human rights.

== See also ==
- Akon City
- Bitcoin City
- Fordlandia
- Próspera
- Telosa
