= Gil Duran =

American journalist (born 1976)

- Duran in 2026
- Born: 1976 (age 49–50)
- Education: DePauw University
- Writing career
- Genres: Journalism, non-fiction
- Notable work: The Nerd Reich: Silicon Valley Fascism and the War on Democracy

Gil José Duran, also spelled Durán, (born 1976) is an American journalist and author based in San Francisco. He is the author of the bestselling book The Nerd Reich: Silicon Valley Fascism and the War on Democracy.

Duran began his career in journalism at the San Jose Mercury News, in 1998. He was later an opinion editor for The Sacramento Bee and an editorial page editor for the San Francisco Examiner. He has previously worked as a political staffer for several Democratic Party officials, as a press secretary for Jerry Brown and as a communications director for Dianne Feinstein and Kamala Harris.

== Early life ==
Duran was born in California, to parents who were working-class Mexican immigrants. He lived with his mother, and younger sister in Tulare, California, when he was a child. After moving to Kentucky, he attended Paul Laurence Dunbar High School in Lexington, where he was an editor and columnist for the school newspaper. He later attended DePauw University in Greencastle, Indiana, graduating in 1998.

== Career ==
After graduating from college, Duran returned to California in 1998 to work as a staff writer for the San Jose Mercury News. A member of the Democratic Party, Duran was a political staffer for four Democratic Party office holders between 2007 and 2013. He was the press secretary to Los Angeles Mayor Antonio Villaraigosa from 2007 to 2008, the communications director for U.S. Senator Dianne Feinstein from 2008 to 2010, and the press secretary for California governor Jerry Brown from 2011 until early 2013.

Duran worked as the communications director for Kamala Harris during her tenure as the California attorney general, serving for five months in 2013. He was later critical of Harris, and was quoted in The Washington Post, The New York Times, The Guardian, and Politico suggesting that Harris had a long history of staff mismanagement. He also blamed Harris for mismanaging her 2020 presidential campaign.

Other employees who worked for Harris questioned the legitimacy of Duran's commentary. Sean Clegg, an advisor to Harris, said that Duran "worked for Kamala for a few months a decade and two political offices ago. It didn't work out. He left bitter and has been attacking Kamala to boost his own flagging relevance since the start of the presidential race." Duran defended his position, saying "I definitely know it's annoying to some people. But nothing I've said has been as damaging as what her own staff members have said about her", alluding to leaked stories by administration officials.

In 2018, Duran became the California opinion editor for The Sacramento Bee and oversaw strategy for the McClatchy Media Company's five California news organizations: The Sacramento Bee, The Fresno Bee, The Modesto Bee, The Merced Sun-Star, and San Luis Obispo's paper The Tribune. He has also served as the editorial page editor for the San Francisco Examiner.

=== Nerd Reich ===
Duran writes the Nerd Reich newsletter, which documents anti-democracy extremism and authoritarian currents within Silicon Valley's tech community. Duran also authored non-fiction best seller The Nerd Reich: Silicon Valley Fascism and the War on Democracy, a book published in 2026, about regulatory capture and abuses of power perpetrated by big tech.

In the book, Duran is highly critical of Peter Thiel, calling him "the father of a small but powerful sect" who exhibits "an unhealthy obsession with the Antichrist" and has invested in surveillance-tech companies with ties to the US government. He characterizes the "Nerd Reich" elite as "a cultish group of tech billionaires who basically seek to replace democracy with something resembling corporate dictatorship" and predicts that "instead of democracy, we will have basically tech feudalism — fiefdoms run by tech corporations."

Writing for The New York Times, Jean Guerrero highlighted a warning from Duran's book about elites who "see a world in decline and seek to profit by hastening its collapse," and said "If anything can heal the rupturing body politic, it may be opposition" to what she calls the rise of transnational oligarchy.

== See also ==
- Technolibertarianism – Techno-political ideology rejecting all forms of government regulation
