= The Bosses of the Senate =

1889 American political cartoon

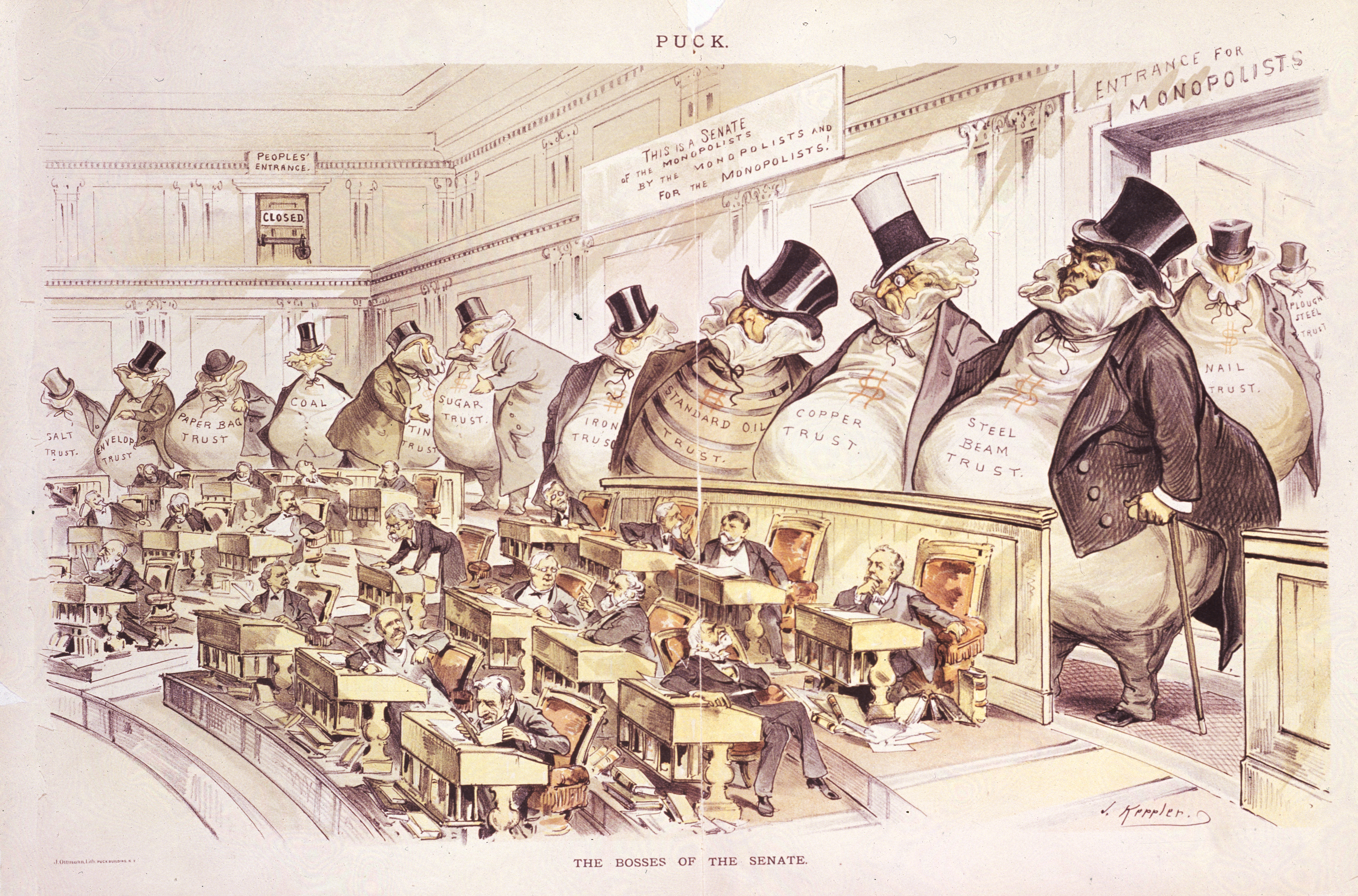
Keppler's 1889 cartoon depicts monopolists as dominating American politics as the "Bosses of the Senate".

The Bosses of the Senate is an American propagandistic political cartoon by Joseph Keppler, published in the January 23, 1889, issue of Puck magazine.

The cartoon depicts the United States Senate as a body under the control of "captains of industry". Robber barons representing trusts in various industries, depicted as obese, domineering, and powerful figures with swollen money bags for bodies, with their nature being juxtaposed with that of the senators of the 50th Congress, who Keppler implies are under the industrialists' control. The cartoon discusses with concern the rise of industry in the Gilded Age, the expanding influence of monopolies and trusts, and the role of American lobbying. It is generally recognized as an early antitrust work of propaganda that played a role in the development of the Sherman Antitrust Act.

According to the Senate, The Bosses of the Senate is a "frequently reproduced cartoon, long a staple of textbooks and studies of Congress". NPR has called the cartoon "the defining image of late 19th-century Washington". Historian Josh Brown has stated that it "expresses general public discontent and concern about the growing impact and power of large businesses" and "their control over the political process".
