= Benjamin Page =

- Born: September 17, 1940 (age 86)
- Education: Stanford University
- Occupation: Professor of political science
- Employer: Northwestern University

Benjamin Ingrim Page (born 17 September 1940) is the Gordon S. Fulcher professor of decision making at Northwestern University. His interests include American politics and U.S. foreign policy, with particular interests in public opinion and policy making, the mass media, empirical democratic theory, and political economy. In 2014, Page, alongside co-author Martin Gilens, appeared on The Daily Show to discuss their study that found the policy-making process of American politics is dominated by economic elites.

Page graduated Phillips Exeter Academy in 1958, graduated cum laude from Stanford University in 1961 with an A.B. in History. He completed his J.D. from Harvard Law School in 1965, and his PhD in Political Science from Stanford in 1973. He completed additional post-doctoral training in Economics at Harvard and Massachusetts Institute of Technology as he completed his dissertation. Page worked as an assistant professor for many institutions including Dartmouth, the University of Chicago, and University of Wisconsin.

From 1983 to 1988, he held the Erwin Chair in the Department of Government at The University of Texas at Austin. In 1988, he became a professor at Northwestern, serving as a professor of decision making for their political science department. Page has served on multiple political, economic, and social science fellowships through his career. As of 2016, his most recent focus is on a project called "Economically Successful Americans and the Common Good".

Page has served on multiple political boards and associations through the years. In 1976, he sat on the Board of Overseers for the American National Election Studies until 1982. He has worked closely with the Midwest Political Science Association (MPSA), serving on its governing council from 1984 to 1986. From 1991 to 1993, he served as vice president to the MPSA.

== Publications ==
- Billionaires and Stealth Politics. Benjamin I. Page, Jason Seawright, and Matthew J. Lacombe. Chicago: University of Chicago Press; 2018
- Gilens and Page: Average citizens have little impact on public policy. Princeton University; 2014 (pnhp.org)
- Living with the Dragon: How the American Public Views the Rise of China. New York: Columbia University Press; 2010. ISBN 0-231-52549-4
- Constrained Internationalism: Adapting to New Realities. Chicago: Chicago Council on Global Affairs; 2010.
- Class War? What Americans Really Think about Economic Inequality.Chicago: University of Chicago Press; 2009 ISBN 0-226-64456-1
- The Foreign Policy Disconnect: What Americans Want from Our Leaders but Do Not Get. Chicago: University of Chicago Press; 2006. ISBN 0-2266-4459-6
- Navigating Public Opinion: Polls, Policy, and the Future of American Democracy. New York: Oxford University Press; 2002.
- Worldviews 2002: American Public Opinion & Foreign Policy. Chicago: Chicago Council on Foreign Relations; 2002.
- What Government Can Do: Dealing with Poverty and Inequality. Chicago: University of Chicago Press; 2000. ISBN 0-226-64481-2
- Who Deliberates? Mass Media and Modern Democracy. Chicago: University of Chicago Press; 1996.
- The Struggle for Democracy: An introduction to American Politics. New York: HarperCollins; 1993.
- The Rational Public: Fifty Years of Trends in Americans' Policy Preferences. Chicago: University of Chicago Press; 1992. ISBN 0-226-64477-4
- Who Gets What from Government. Berkeley, CA: University of California Press; 1983.
- The American Presidency. New York: McGraw-Hill; 1983. ISBN 0-0704-8109-1
- Choices and Echoes in Presidential Elections: Rational Man and Electoral Democracy. Chicago: University of Chicago Press; 1978.
- The Politics of Representation: The Democratic Convention in 1972. New York: St. Martins; 1974
