= Winklevoss twins =

Cameron and Tyler Winklevoss

The Winklevoss twins are:

- Cameron Winklevoss (born 1981), American investor, rower, and entrepreneur
- Tyler Winklevoss (born 1981), American investor, rower, and entrepreneur
