= Paulina Borsook =

American technology journalist

Paulina Borsook is an American technology journalist and author who has written for Wired, Mother Jones, and Suck.com. She may be known best for her 2000 book entitled Cyberselfish, a critique of the libertarian mindset of the digital technology community and how the technology is affecting society. As an artist-in-residence at Stanford University, in 2013 she began work on My Life as a Ghost, an art installation based on her experiences living with the traumatic brain injury she suffered due to gunshot when she was 14 years old.

== Biography ==
Paulina Borsook was born in Pasadena, California. In 1969, when she was 15, she ran away from home and stayed at Rochdale College in Toronto, Canada. She later attended University of California, Santa Barbara where she ran a radio show on KCSB. She was graduated from University of California, Berkeley with a degree in psycholinguistics and a minor in philosophy. She then attended graduate school at the University of Arizona before transferring to Columbia University where she earned her MFA.

Beginning in 1981, Borsook was employed at a Marin County, California software company. In 1984, she worked for the a New York-based publication, Data Communications. She returned to San Francisco in 1987.

Borsook has written extensively about the culture surrounding technology, including Silicon Valley, cypherpunks, bionomics, and technolibertarianism. Her first short story, "Virtual Romance", was nominated for the Pushcart Prize. She became a contributing writer at Wired in the 1990s and her short story about an e-mail romance, "Love Over The Wires", was the first fiction published by the magazine. She wrote for Mother Jones and Suck.com under the name "Justine".

Borsook is a contributing editor of In Formation, a magazine focused on how technology affects society.

=== Cyberselfish ===
Borsook wrote the book Cyberselfish: A Critical Romp Through the Terribly Libertarian Culture of High Tech, which was published by PublicAffairs in 2000. The book was based on her 1996 essay that appeared in Mother Jones and that traces the origins of technolibertarianism. In the book, she characterizes the culture of the digital technology community as predominately libertarian, anti-government, and anti-regulation.

Cyberselfish criticized the lack of philanthropy in digital technology circles and questioned how an industry birthed through government funding could be so vehemently anti-government. The book also includes Borsook's experiences as a woman at Wired magazine and in Silicon Valley. Open-source software advocate Eric S. Raymond criticized Borsook's take in an article he wrote for Salon in 2000.

More than two decades after the Silicon Valley dismissal of the book, her work has received renewed positive attention and her work is reinterpreted as prescient and accurate in its original scope. Reflecting on the public's newfound appreciation for the book, Borsook told The New York Times in 2025, "we are alas living in the tech-driven culture I saw headed our way 30 years ago." Cyberselfish is due to be republished in September 2026.

=== My Life as a Ghost ===
As a 14-year-old, Borsook suffered a traumatic brain injury (TBI) after being shot in the head. In 2013, after attending a meeting of people with such injuries, Borsook realized that some others with TBI had the same experiences of disconnection she had after the injury, a "ghostly" feeling that "[s]omething gets dislocated in the sense of knowing that you belong to yourself and your life". From this epiphany, she conceived the project “My Life as a Ghost”, an art installation that combines video, audio, performance, and other media into a built environment to explore "[w]hat happens when the soul is blasted out of the body and is incompletely returned".

She became the first artist in the Stanford Arts Institute’s new Research Residency program. In October 2013, she presented the concept of the program to an audience at Stanford University's Bing Theatre.

== Environmental advocacy ==
She has advocated for the end of the light brown apple moth eradication programs of the United States Department of Agriculture (USDA) and the California Department of Food and Agriculture (CDFA).

== Personal life ==
Borsook lives in Santa Cruz, California. She is divorced. While her book was successful, her career opportunities became much more limited after its publication, leading her to speculate on whether she had been blacklisted.

== Bibliography ==
=== By Paulina Borsook ===
==== Books ====
- Cyberselfish. a critical romp through the terribly libertarian culture of high tech, PublicAffairs, 2000, 1st ed., ISBN 1891620789, 276 p.
- German Translation: Schöne neue Cyberwelt. Mythen, Helden, und Irrwege des Hightech, dtv, 2001, translator: Hubert Beck, ISBN 9783423242554)
