= Digital authoritarianism =

Method of authoritarianism

Digital authoritarianism, also known as digital dictatorship, is the use of digital technologies by authoritarian regimes to monitor, control, and suppress political opposition and social dissent in both foreign and domestic populations to maintain political power and limit civil liberties. The tactics employed in the context of digital authoritarianism may include mass surveillance, including through biometric identification such as facial recognition, the implementation of internet firewalls and censorship, internet blackouts, the dissemination of disinformation campaigns, and the establishment of digital social credit systems. Although some institutions assert that this term should only be used to refer to authoritarian governments, others argue that the tools of digital authoritarianism are being adopted and implemented by governments with "authoritarian tendencies", including democracies.

Notably, the Brookings Institution has accused China and Russia of leveraging the Internet and information technology to repress domestic opposition and undermine foreign democracies.

== Definition ==
According to reports and articles on China's practice, the basis of the digital authoritarianism is an advanced, all-encompassing, and in large part real-time surveillance system, which merges government-run systems and databases (e.g., traffic monitoring, financial credit rating, education system, health sector, etc.) with company surveillance systems (e.g., of shopping preferences, activities on social media platforms, etc.). Digital authoritarianism institutionalizes the data transfer between companies and governmental agencies, providing the government with full and regular access to data collected by companies. The authoritarian government remains the only entity with unlimited access to the collected data. Digital authoritarianism thus increases the authority of the regime vis-à-vis national and multinational companies as well as vis-à-vis other decentralized or subnational political forces and interest groups. The collected data is utilized by the authoritarian regime to analyze and influence the behavior of a country’s citizens, companies, and other institutions. It does so with the help of algorithms based on the principles and norms of the authoritarian regime, automatically calculating credit scores for every individual and institution. In contrast to financial credit ratings, these “social credit scores” are based on the full range of collected surveillance data, including financial as well as non-financial information. Digital authoritarianism only allows full participation in a country’s economy and society for those who have a good credit score and thus respect the rules and norms of the respective authoritarian regime. Behavior deviating from these norms incurs automatic punishment through a bad credit score, which leads to economic or social disadvantages (loan conditions, lower job opportunities, no participation in public procurement, etc.). Severe violation or non-compliance can lead to the exclusion from any economic activities on the respective market or (for individuals) to an exclusion from public services.

== Examples ==
=== China ===
China is often cited as the most prominent example of digital authoritarianism. China has been viewed as the cutting edge and the enabler of digital authoritarianism. With its Great Firewall of a state-controlled Internet, it has deployed high-tech repression against Uyghurs in Xinjiang and exported surveillance and monitoring systems to 18 countries as of 2019.

The Chinese Communist Party (CCP) employs extensive internet censorship, facial recognition, and AI-driven surveillance to monitor its population and control political discourse. Over half of the world's one billion surveillance cameras are located in China, and the government has introduced a state-managed digital ID system to enhance its control over internet usage among its citizens. This system requires users to submit sensitive personal data, including facial scans, to receive a unique code for accessing online services. Critics argue that it signifies greater consolidation of power and threatens individual freedoms.

According to Freedom House, the China model of digital authoritarianism through internet control against those who are critical of the CCP features legislation of censorship; surveillance using artificial intelligence (AI) and facial recognition; manipulation or removal of online content; cyberattacks and spear phishing; suspension and revocation of social media accounts; detention and arrests; and forced disappearance and torture, among other means. A report by Carnegie Endowment for International Peace also highlights similar digital repression techniques. In 2013, The Diplomat reported that the Chinese hackers behind the malware attacks on Falun Gong supporters in China, the Philippines, and Vietnam were the same ones responsible for attacks against foreign military powers, targeting email accounts and stealing Microsoft Outlook login information and email contents.

The 2022 analysis by The New York Times of over 100,000 Chinese government bidding documents revealed a range of surveillance and data collection practices, from personal biometrics to behavioral data, which are fed into AI systems. China utilizes these data capabilities not only to enhance governmental and infrastructural efficiency but also to monitor and suppress dissent among its population, particularly in Xinjiang, where the government targets the Uyghur community under the guise of counterterrorism and public security. China is also regarded as an exporter of these technologies and practices to other states, while simultaneously serving as a model for other regimes seeking to adopt similar technologies or governance.

=== Russia ===
Under President Vladimir Putin, Russia has developed a repressive law enforcement and criminal justice system that intimidates the population, civil society, and businesses into silence and submission. The government has implemented laws that penalize individuals for deliberately searching for or accessing online content labeled as "extremist." This legislation imposes fines and has sparked concern over its implications for digital freedoms and potential abuse.

The Russian model of digital authoritarianism relies on strict laws of digital expression and the technology to enforce them. Since 2012, as part of a broader crackdown on civil society, the Russian Parliament has adopted numerous laws curtailing speech and expression. Hallmarks of Russian digital authoritarianism include:

1. The surveillance of all Internet traffic through the System for Operative Investigative Activities (SORM) and the Semantic Archive;
2. Restrictive laws on the freedom of speech and expression, including the blacklisting of hundreds of thousands of websites, and punishment including fines and jail time for activities including slander, "insulting religious feelings", and "acts of extremism".
3. Infrastructure regulations, including requirements for Internet service providers (ISPs) to install deep packet inspection equipment under the 2019 Sovereign Internet Law.

=== Iran ===
Iran's regime has invested heavily in digital surveillance to identify and silence voices of dissent. Key institutions have emerged to develop new legal precedents, technologies, and mechanisms of detection to capture cyber activists. The government has established the National Information Network, known as the "Halal Internet," to regulate the internet and control the flow of data. This effort aims to safeguard national sovereignty through persistent control and promote a particular ideological behavior within cyberspace.

=== Myanmar ===
Since the coup d'état in February 2021, the military junta has blocked all but 1,200 websites and imposed Internet shutdowns, with pro-military dominating the content on the remaining accessible websites. In May 2021, Reuters reported that telecom and Internet service providers had been secretly ordered to install spyware allowing the military to "listen in on calls, view text messages and web traffic including emails, and track the locations of users without the assistance of the telecom and internet firms." In February 2022, Norwegian service provider Telenor was forced to sell its operation to a local company aligned with the military junta. The military junta also sought to criminalize virtual private networks (VPNs), imposed mandatory registration of devices, and increased surveillance on both social media platforms and via telecom companies.

In July 2022, the military executed activist Kyaw Min Yu after arresting him in November 2021 for prodemocracy social media posts criticizing the coup.

=== Africa ===
A study by the African Digital Rights Network (ADRN) revealed that governments in ten African countries—South Africa, Cameroon, Zimbabwe, Uganda, Nigeria, Zambia, Sudan, Kenya, Ethiopia, and Egypt—have employed various forms of digital authoritarianism. The most common tactics include digital surveillance, disinformation, Internet shutdowns, censorship legislation, and arrests for anti-government speech. The researchers highlighted the growing trend of complete Internet or mobile system shutdowns. Additionally, all ten countries utilized Internet surveillance, mobile intercept technologies, or artificial intelligence to monitor targeted individuals using specific keywords.

=== Egypt ===
Egypt has implemented policies and strategies aimed at censorship, digital deception, and mass surveillance, worsening human rights conditions in the region. Security authorities routinely surveil and target social media posts as a basis for the arrest and detention of citizens. The state relies on provisions such as "spreading false news," "joining a banned group," and "misuse of social media" to detain individuals for digital expression.

== Criticism and human rights concerns ==
Digital authoritarianism has been widely criticized for its profound implications on human rights, particularly concerning freedom of expression, the right to privacy, and access to information. By deploying advanced surveillance technologies and internet controls, authoritarian regimes can monitor citizens' online behavior in unprecedented detail, raising concerns about mass privacy violations. These practices often extend beyond political dissidents to target ordinary citizens, journalists, academics, and minority groups, creating a climate of fear and self-censorship. Critics argue that pervasive monitoring erodes the public's ability to communicate freely and undermines democratic norms globally.

The manipulation of digital platforms also facilitates widespread dissemination of disinformation, which can distort public discourse and marginalize opposition voices. Social media campaigns orchestrated by state-sponsored actors employ bots, troll armies, and algorithmic amplification to shape political narratives and suppress dissenting opinions. These strategies not only compromise electoral integrity but also foster polarization, making it more difficult for civil society to organize independent movements or challenge government policies. Human rights organizations have repeatedly highlighted that the digital manipulation of information constitutes a direct threat to democratic participation and the right to receive and impart information freely.

Another primary concern is the legal framework that underpins digital authoritarianism. Many regimes introduce vague or broadly defined laws criminalizing online activity under the guise of national security, "fake news," or public order. In practice, these regulations often serve as tools to arrest and intimidate activists, journalists, and critics, bypassing due process. The enforcement of such laws disproportionately affects marginalized groups, including ethnic and religious minorities, who may already face systemic discrimination. Reports have documented cases in which individuals have been detained, interrogated, or fined solely for sharing political opinions or participating in digital protests, highlighting the chilling effect of these policies on civil liberties.

International human rights organizations have emphasized that digital authoritarianism represents not merely a domestic concern but a global challenge. As authoritarian regimes export surveillance technologies and collaborate with private tech companies abroad, these practices threaten to normalize digital repression worldwide. The proliferation of such technologies in countries with weak democratic institutions risks entrenching authoritarian control and limiting citizens' access to independent media, accurate information, and platforms for civic engagement. Scholars and activists argue that combating digital authoritarianism requires not only policy interventions at the national level but also coordinated international efforts to uphold digital rights, promote transparency in technology governance, and strengthen protections for vulnerable populations.
