= Egalitarianism =

School of thought favoring equality for all people

Weighing scales often symbolize equality before the law.

Egalitarianism (from French égal 'equal'; also equalitarianism) is a school of thought within political philosophy that builds on the concept of social equality, prioritizing it for all people. Egalitarian doctrines are generally characterized by the idea that all humans are equal in fundamental worth or moral status. As such, all people should be accorded equal rights and treatment under the law. Egalitarian doctrines have been important in many modern political philosophies and social movements, including the Enlightenment, classical liberalism, libertarianism, feminism, civil rights, and international human rights. Egalitarianism is a major principle of both classical liberalism with its equality of rights, and redistributive left-wing politics with its stress on equality of outcome.

One key aspect of egalitarianism is its emphasis on equal opportunities for all individuals, regardless of their background or circumstances. This means ensuring that everyone has access to the same resources, education, and opportunities to succeed in life. By promoting equal opportunities, egalitarianism aims to level the playing field and reduce disparities that result from social inequalities.

== Forms ==
Some specifically focused egalitarian concerns include communism, legal egalitarianism, luck egalitarianism, political egalitarianism, gender egalitarianism, racial equality, equality of opportunity, and Christian egalitarianism. Common forms of egalitarianism include political and philosophical.

=== Legal egalitarianism ===
One argument is that liberalism provides democratic societies with the means to carry out civic reform by providing a framework for developing public policy and providing the correct conditions for individuals to achieve civil rights. There are two major types of equality:

- Formal equality: individual merit-based equality of opportunity.
- Substantive equality: moves away from individual merit-based comparison towards equality of outcomes for groups and social equity.

The preference between different forms of equality varies and can depend on the context according to opinion polls.

==== Equality of person ====
The English Bill of Rights of 1689 and the United States Constitution use only the term person in operative language involving fundamental rights and responsibilities, except for a reference to men in the English Bill of Rights regarding men on trial for treason; and a rule of proportional Congressional representation in the 14th Amendment to the United States Constitution.

As the rest of the Constitution, in its operative language the 14th Amendment to the United States Constitution uses the term person, stating that "nor shall any State deprives any person of life, liberty, or property, without due process of law; nor deny any person within its jurisdiction the equal protection of the laws".

==== Gender equality ====
The motto "Liberté, égalité, fraternité" was used during the French Revolution and is still used as an official motto of the French government. The 1789 Declaration of the Rights of Man and the Citizen French Constitution is also framed with this basis in equal rights of humankind.

The Declaration of Independence of the United States is an example of an assertion of equality of men as "All men are created equal" and the wording of men and man is a reference to both men and women, i.e., mankind. John Locke is sometimes considered the founder of this form. Many state constitutions in the United States also use the rights of man language rather than rights of person since the noun man has always been a reference to and an inclusion of both men and women.

The Tunisian Constitution of 2014 provides that "men and women shall be equal in their rights and duties".

Feminism is informed by egalitarian philosophy, being a gender-focused philosophy of equality. Feminism is distinguished from egalitarianism by also existing as a political and social movement focusing primarily on women's rights.

=== Social egalitarianism ===
At a cultural level, outcome based egalitarian theories have developed during the past two hundred years. These are based on an end-state theory of distributive justice rather than an entitlement theory of justice. Among the notable broadly egalitarian philosophies are socialism, communism, social anarchism, libertarian socialism, left-libertarianism, and progressivism, some of which propound economic egalitarianism. Anti-egalitarianism or elitism is opposition to egalitarianism.

==== Economic ====
An early example of equality is what might be described as outcome economic egalitarianism is the Chinese philosophy of agriculturalism which held that the economic policies of a country need to be based upon egalitarian self-sufficiency.

In socialism, social ownership of means of production is sometimes considered to be a form of economic egalitarianism because in an economy characterized by social ownership the surplus product generated by industry would accrue to the population as a whole as opposed to a class of private owners, thereby granting each increased autonomy and greater equality in their relationships with one another. Although the economist Karl Marx is sometimes mistaken to be an egalitarian, Marx eschewed normative theorizing on moral principles altogether. Marx did have a theory of the evolution of moral principles concerning specific economic systems.

The American economist John Roemer has put forth a new perspective on equality and its relationship to socialism. Roemer attempts to reformulate Marxist analysis to accommodate normative principles of distributive justice, shifting the argument for socialism away from purely technical and materialist reasons to one of distributive justice. Roemer argues that according to the principle of distributive justice, the traditional definition of socialism is based on the principle that individual compensation is proportional to the value of the labor one expends in production ("To each according to his contribution") is inadequate. Roemer concludes that egalitarians must reject socialism as it is classically defined for equality to be realized.

The egalitarian management style focuses on the approach to democratize power, decision-making, and responsibility and distributed them more evenly among all members of a team or organization.

=== Egalitarianism and non-human animals ===
Many philosophers, including Ingmar Persson, Peter Vallentyne, Nils Holtug, Catia Faria and Lewis Gompertz, have argued that egalitarianism implies that the interests of non-human animals must be taken into account as well. Philosopher Oscar Horta has further argued that egalitarianism implies rejecting speciesism, ceasing to exploit non-human animals and aiding animals suffering in nature. Furthermore, Horta argues that non-human animals should be prioritized since they are worse off than humans.

=== Religious and spiritual egalitarianism ===
==== Buddhism ====
In the early Buddhist texts, the Buddha critiques the Brahmanical religion and social system on certain key points. For example, the Buddha disagreed with the divine basis for caste (jāti) distinctions made in the Brahmanical religion, and he offered ordination to all regardless of caste (whereas in Brahmanism, only those born to brahmins can be priests and study the religious scriptures). In regards to the social system (varna), although Buddha did not try to dismantle this system, he spoke out against Brahmin supremacism and the notion of any varna being superior or inferior to another. Thus, the Buddha also critiqued the idea that brahmins were somehow superior or inherently pure due to their bloodline. The Vasetthasutta argues that the main difference among humans are their actions and occupations, not their bloodline.

Furthermore, the Buddha holds that there is one universal moral law (Dharma) that is valid for everybody. Thus, Buddhism rejects the idea of caste duty (svadharma), the idea that every person is assigned a fixed duty or law based on the caste they are born into. Furthermore, for Buddhists, violence was wrong for all, whether one was part of the warrior caste or not.

While the caste system constitutes an assumed background to the stories told in Buddhist scriptures, they do not agree with the Vedic justification for this system. According to the Aggañña Sutta, all social classes or varnas arose naturally through sociological factors, they were not divinely ordained. As Bronkhorst writes, this sutra rejects the view that the Brahmin caste was born from the mouth of God and thus are special. Instead, it states that this class of people developed because people in the past meditated and compiled scriptures.

In the Aggañña Sutta, Buddha also argues that good and bad deeds are found in all castes and that moral purity comes from one's own actions, not one's birth. Because of this, all castes including untouchables were welcome in the Buddhist order and when someone joined, they renounced all caste affiliation.

==== Christianity ====
In 1957, Martin Luther King Jr. quoted Galatians 3:28 ("There is neither Jew nor Greek, slave nor free, male nor female, for you are all one in Christ Jesus") in a pamphlet opposing racial segregation in the United States. He wrote, "Racial segregation is a blatant denial of the unity which we all have in Christ." He also alluded to that verse at the end of his 1963 "I Have a Dream" speech. The verse is cited to support an egalitarian interpretation of Christianity. According to Jakobus M. Vorster, the central question debated by theologians is whether the statement about ecclesiastical relationships can be translated into a Christian-ethical norm for all human relationships. Vorster argues that it can, and that the verse provides a Christian foundation for the promotion of human rights and equality, in contrast to "patriarchy, racism and exploitation" which in his opinion are caused by human sinfulness. Karin Neutel notes how some apply the philosophy of Paul's statement to include sexuality, health and race saying "[The original] three pairs must have been as relevant in the first century, as the additional categories are today." She argues that the verse points to a utopian, cosmopolitan community.

==== Islam ====
The verse 49:13 of The Quran states: "O mankind, indeed We have created you from male and female and made you peoples and tribes that you may know one another. Indeed, the noblest of you in the sight of Allah is the most righteous of you. Indeed, Allah is Knowing and Acquainted". Muhammad echoed these egalitarian sentiments, sentiments that clashed with the practices of the pre-Islamic cultures. In a review of Louise Marlow's Hierarchy and Egalitarianism in Islamic Thought, Ismail Poonawala argues the desire for the Arab-Muslim Empire to consolidate power and administer the state rather led to the deemphasis of egalitarian teachings in the Qur'an and by the Prophet.

== Discussion ==
=== Alexander Berkman and Thompson et al. ===
Thompson et al. theorize that any society consisting of only one perspective, be it egalitarianism, hierarchies, individualist, fatalist or autonomists will be inherently unstable as the claim is that an interplay between all these perspectives are required if each perspective is to be fulfilling. Although an individualist according to cultural theory is aversive towards both principles and groups, individualism is not fulfilling if individual brilliance cannot be recognized by groups, or if individual brilliance cannot be made permanent in the form of principles. Accordingly, they argue that egalitarians have no power except through their presence, unless they (by definition, reluctantly) embrace principles which enable them to cooperate with fatalists and hierarchies. They argue that this means they will also have no individual sense of direction without a group, which could be mitigated by following individuals outside their group, namely autonomists or individualists. Alexander Berkman suggests that "equality does not mean an equal amount but equal opportunity. ... Do not make the mistake of identifying equality in liberty with the forced equality of the convict camp. True anarchist equality implies freedom, not quantity. It does not mean that everyone must eat, drink, or wear the same things, do the same work, or live in the same manner. Far from it: the very reverse. ... Individual needs and tastes differ, as appetites differ. It is an equal opportunity to satisfy them that constitutes true equality. ... Far from leveling, such equality opens the door for the greatest possible variety of activity and development. For human character is diverse."

The cultural theory of risk holds egalitarianism—with fatalism termed as its opposite—as defined by a negative attitude towards rules and principles; and a positive attitude towards group decision-making. The theory distinguishes between hierarchists, who are positive towards both rules and groups; and egalitarians, who are positive towards groups, but negative towards rules. This is by definition a form of anarchist equality as referred to by Berkman. Thus, the fabric of an egalitarian society is held together by cooperation and implicit peer pressure rather than by explicit rules and punishment.

=== Marxism ===
Karl Marx and Friedrich Engels believed that an international proletarian revolution would bring about a socialist society which would then eventually give way to a communist stage of social development which would be a classless, stateless, moneyless, humane society erected on common ownership of the means of production and the principle of "From each according to their ability, to each according to their needs". Marxism rejected egalitarianism in the sense of greater equality between classes, clearly distinguishing it from the socialist notion of the abolition of classes based on the division between workers and owners of productive property.

Allen Woods finds that Marx's view of classlessness was not the subordination of society to a universal interest such as a universal notion of equality, but it was about the creation of the conditions that would enable individuals to pursue their true interests and desires, making Marx's notion of communist society radically individualistic. Although his position is often confused or conflated with distributive egalitarianism in which only the goods and services resulting from production are distributed according to notional equality, Marx eschewed the entire concept of equality as abstract and bourgeois, preferring to focus on more concrete principles such as opposition to exploitation on materialist grounds and economic logic, or the philosophical concepts like alienation.

=== Murray Rothbard ===
In the title essay of his book Egalitarianism as a Revolt Against Nature and Other Essays, Murray Rothbard argued that egalitarian theory always results in a politics of statist control because it is founded on revolt against the ontological structure of reality itself. According to Rothbard, individuals are naturally unequal in their abilities, talents, and characteristics. He believed that this inequality was not only natural but necessary for a functioning society. In his view, people's unique qualities and abilities are what allow them to contribute to society in different ways.

Rothbard argued that egalitarianism was a misguided attempt to impose an artificial equality on individuals, which would ultimately lead to societal breakdown. He believed that attempts to force equality through government policies or other means would stifle individual freedom and prevent people from pursuing their own interests and passions. Furthermore, Rothbard believed that egalitarianism was rooted in envy and resentment towards those who were more successful or talented than others. He saw it as a destructive force that would lead to a culture of mediocrity, where people were discouraged from striving for excellence.

=== Equity ===
The Atlas movement defines equitism as the idea that all groups should have equal rights and benefits. The term has been used as the claimed philosophical basis of Telosa, a proposed utopia to be built in the United States by Marc Lore. Social equity is about equality of outcomes for each groups, while egalitarianism generally advocates for equality of opportunity, recognizing that a fair society should provide all members with the same opportunities while recognizing that different outcomes are expected due to human individuality.

== See also ==
- "All men are created equal"
- Animal rights
- Asset-based egalitarianism
- Citizen's dividend
- Consociationalism
- Deep ecology
- Discrimination
- Economic inequality
- Egalitarian social choice rule
- Equal consideration of interests
- Equal opportunity
- Equality feminism
- Equality of outcome
- Federation of Egalitarian Communities
- Gift economy
- Inequity aversion
- Left-wing politics
- Legal status of transgender people
- LGBT rights by country or territory
- Men's rights movement
- Men's liberation movement
- Meritocracy
- Mutualism
- Natural rights and legal rights
- Political egalitarianism
- "One man, one vote"
- Reciprocal altruism
- Redistributive justice
- Same-sex marriage
- Social dividend
- Transfeminism
- Universal basic income
