= Wonder Group =

American food delivery company

- Type: Privately held company
- Industry: Restaurants; Food delivery
- Founded: 2018; 8 years ago
- Founders: Marc Lore
- Website: www.wonder.com

The Wonder Group is a food delivery startup founded in 2018.

Wonder's chairman and CEO Marc Lore has stated that "the big vision is to create a fully autonomous food platform that’s capable of autonomously planning, cooking, and delivering your food, so that we can make great food much more accessible."

== History ==
In April 2018, Marc Lore founded Wonder.

According to Fortune magazine, Wonder had received $500M in "venture funding from partners, including NEA, Accel, GV, General Catalyst, and Bain Capital Ventures" as of 2021.

In March 2024, Wonder announced a $700M fundraising round.

In May 2025, Wonder announced a $600M fundraising round led by existing shareholders New Enterprise Associates, Accel, Google Ventures, and Forerunner, as well as strategic investors, such as Amex Ventures. This round brought Wonder's valuation to $7 billion.

In July 2026, Wonder announced a $650M fundraising round valuing the company at $9.65 billion.

=== Acquisitions ===
Wonder acquired Blue Apron in November 2023 for $103M.

In November 2024, Wonder bought Grubhub from Just Eat Takeaway for $650 million.

In 2025, Wonder bought Sweetgreen's robotics subsidiary, Spyce, for $186M.

In August 2026, Wonder acquired the New York City restaurant Salt Hank's, founded by food influencer Henry Laporte the year prior.
