= Henry Laporte =

American chef and content creator

- Born: Petaluma, California
- Culinary career
- Current restaurant
- Salt Hank's
- Awards
- Esquire 20 Best Cookbooks of 2024

Henry Laporte, who professionally goes by Salt Hank, is an American chef and influencer. He is known for his social media presence, of which he has nearly 5 million followers. He is also known for his cookbook, Salt Hank: A Five Napkin Situation, which was ranked in Esquire's best cookbooks of 2024, and his eponymous restaurant Salt Hank's, based in New York City.

== Biography ==
Laporte was born and raised in Petaluma, California to father Leo Laporte. He developed an interest in food in his youth. He studied broadcast journalism at the University of Colorado Boulder. At first, he focused on trying to apply to traditional PA positions at organizations like Tastemade, but he then decided to start creating content himself.

On social media, he is best known for his sandwiches, both in short-form content on Instagram and TikTok and in his longer-format YouTube series Side of Salt. He has also partnered with Spotify to promote Spotify Wrapped. As of 2026, he had nearly 5 million followers across social media platforms.

Laporte wrote his first cookbook, Salt Hank: A Five Napkin Situation, in 2024. It was blurbed by Gordon Ramsay. It was ranked in Esquire's 20 Best Cookbooks of 2024, and was also ranked positively by other critics including CookingWorld and CoolFoodDude. That same year, he appeared at the Food and Wine Festival in South Beach.

He appeared on The Drew Barrymore Show in 2025. He was named a Creator to Watch by TikTok in 2026, and that same year was named to the Food Network Hot List.

=== Salt Hank's ===
Laporte opened his first restaurant, Salt Hank's, on Bleecker Street in New York in 2025. He has detailed the rapid pace between deciding to open it and the actual opening. The restaurant sells only one entree, French dip sandwiches, as well as sides, and is also known for its long line. The French Dip has been rated positively by journals including Food & Wine, The Infatuation, The New York Times, and USA Today.

In August 2026, Salt Hank's was acquired by billionaire Marc Lore's ghost kitchen startup Wonder, which also owns Blue Apron and Grubhub.
