= Jet.com =

American e-commerce company (2014–2020)

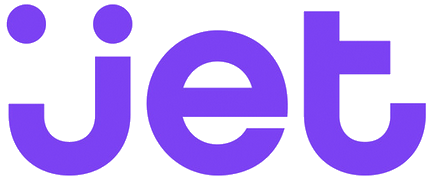

- Screenshot
- Company type: Subsidiary
- Website type: E-commerce
- Founded: April 2014; 12 years ago
- Dissolved: 2020
- Founders: Marc Lore; Nate Faust; Mike Hanrahan
- Key people: Marc Lore (president, CEO of Wal-Mart Global e-Commerce, USA)
- Industry: Online shopping
- Employees: 1,000–5,000 (July 2016)
- Parent: Walmart
- Website: jet.com (defunct, redirects to Walmart.com)
- Current status: Closed as of June 4, 2020

Jet.com was an American e-commerce company headquartered in Hoboken, New Jersey. The company was co-founded in 2014 by Marc Lore (who had previously sold Diapers.com to Amazon.com), along with Mike Hanrahan and Nate Faust. Jet.com raised $820 million over four venture rounds from GV, Goldman Sachs, Bain Capital Ventures, Accel Partners, Alibaba Group, and Fidelity. The website was formally launched in July 2015. In September 2016, it became a subsidiary of Walmart.

In June 2019, in the wake of slumping sales through the Jet.com site in the period following the acquisition, the majority of Jet.com employees were transferred to work on the Walmart.com site and Simon Belsham, the president of Jet.com, stepped down. On May 19, 2020, Walmart announced that it was shutting down Jet.com, which they did on June 4, directing visitors to use Walmart.com instead.

== History ==
After Marc Lore sold Diapers.com to Amazon in November 2010, he speculated that users might be willing to accept longer wait times on obtaining online-purchased goods if they could save money on their purchases. He said that existing Internet retailers were catering only to wealthier customers "who care more about convenience than value". Lore initially set out to create a site that would use a fee-based membership model like Costco and Sam's Club and combine this with the broad selection of a general e-commerce retailer, somewhat like Amazon Prime but emphasizing reduced product prices for members rather than fast free shipping. He began to peddle the idea, and after lunch with a partner at Accel Ventures, Lore was promised $1 million in seed capital to start a new site. To create transparency and reduce squabbling over salaries, Lore created a 10-tier salary and title system. Recruits were assigned to one of the levels based on experience, thus eliminating salary negotiations.

A prominent feature of the site was its pricing scheme. Pricing adjustments were offered to encourage users to buy more items at once and to purchase items that were located in the same distribution center, thus making the purchases less expensive for the company to collect and ship. As users added items to their virtual shopping cart, they were encouraged to select additional items using pricing incentives. Pricing options were also offered during the check-out process, such as having the user opt out of the ability to return merchandise for free in exchange for a reduced price.

It was initially announced that the site would charge users a $50 annual membership fee after a 90-day free trial period, and that the membership fee would be the only source of profit for the company – so the merchandise would be sold at break-even prices by Jet.com. Lore said "The bottom line is, we're basically not making a dime on any of the transactions. We're passing it all back to the consumer." It was also announced that the site was planned to primarily function as a marketplace for members to access offerings from third-party merchant partners rather than having Jet.com selling goods itself directly.

The site was launched with an initiative called Jet Insider, which was a campaign to spread the word about the company before its official public launch. Users who signed up were offered six months of site membership for free and a link to use to refer friends and family to sign up. Referrers were given prizes such as lifetime memberships or five year memberships, and the top 10 referrers were given stock options. By February 2015, about 352,000 users had signed up and the early membership program was closed. Beta testers reported mixed reviews on the site's benefits.

As of July 2015, the site had 4.5 million products available for sale. After the beta period, the site was officially launched on July 21, 2015. The plan to use a fee-based membership model was dropped in October 2015. In November 2015, Jet.com was rumored to be raising $500 million, but ended up raising $350 million in venture capital led by Fidelity. In May 2016, Jet.com was reported to have been valued at $1.3 billion (around $1.71 billion in 2025) in its latest funding round and had launched a pilot program for a grocery delivery service similar to AmazonFresh. However, the site was also reported to be "bleeding money".

In August 2016, The Wall Street Journal reported that Walmart was in talks with Jet.com to acquire the company. It was announced on August 8, 2016, that Walmart would acquire Jet.com for $3.3 billion (around $4.33 billion in 2025) ($3 billion in cash and up to $300 million in stock paid out over time to the founders and other selected individuals at the company). In December 2016, Jet.com completed the acquisition of ShoeBuy from IAC. ShoeBuy was re-branded as Shoes.com shortly after the acquisition closed.

== Features ==
One of the core features of Jet was the "realtime pricing algorithm", which, according to cofounder Marc Lore, aimed to gauge "the true marginal cost of getting that product to [customers]". Items were priced based on their locations in distribution centers. If, for example, a user purchased several items that were all located in the same distribution center, their price would be lower than if they are located in separate centers. If the user waived their right to return an item, the item decreased in price. Paying by a less expensive form of payment, for example by using a debit card rather than a credit card, would also decrease the price. The site was also linked with partner sites such as TigerDirect.com and the Sony Store.

Jet Anywhere was a program that allowed Jet users to spend money at other venues and earn "JetCash", which could be spent on the actual Jet site. Partner sites in the program included Ann Taylor, Bloomingdale's, Hotels.com, and Nike. Jet Anywhere was ended in March 2017.

Jet ran into some backlash in August 2015 after displaying some links to other websites as if they were partnering sites, when in fact they were not. Businesses such as Macy's, Walmart, and Home Depot detached themselves from Jet because of the incident. Jet removed all the links to sites of businesses that requested removal. Jet's chief customer officer stated that the businesses that wished to be removed viewed Jet as a competitor.

== Business model ==
Prices were generated by the pricing algorithm that adjusted the price of the contents in the cart based on distribution centers the items come from. The Wall Street Journal reported in July 2015, that in a test purchase on the site, Jet had sold the newspaper 12 items for $275.55 that had cost the site $518.46 – losing $242.91 on the transaction.

The Jet Partner program allowed companies to sell their products on Jet's site by registering for an account and integrating application programming interface (API) components into their systems.

== See also ==
- List of tech companies in the New York metropolitan area
