= James E. Ulland =

American politician (1942–2024)

- 1981 portrait of Ulland

8th Minnesota Senate Minority Leader
- In office 1983–1985
- Preceded by: Robert O. Ashbach
- Succeeded by: Glen Taylor

Member of the Minnesota Senate from the 8th district
- In office 1977–1985

Member of the Minnesota House of Representatives from the 8B district
- In office 1973–1977

Member of the Minnesota House of Representatives from the 61A district
- In office 1969–1973

Personal details
- Born: James Edward Ulland; June 30, 1942 St. Louis County, Minnesota, U.S.
- Died: November 29, 2024 (aged 82)
- Party: Republican
- Spouse: Laurel Donaldson Ulland
- Education: Carleton College; University of Pennsylvania
- Occupation: Economist/Tree Farmer

James Edward Ulland (June 30, 1942 – November 29, 2024) was an American politician in the state of Minnesota. He served in the Minnesota House of Representatives from 1969 to 1977 and in the Minnesota Senate from 1977 to 1985. He served as Minnesota Senate Minority Leader from 1983 to 1985. Ulland died on November 29, 2024, at the age of 82.
