= H (company) =

French artificial intelligence company

H Company
- Type: Private
- Industry: Artificial intelligence
- Founded: 2023
- Founders: Laurent Sifre; Charles Kantor; Daan Wiestra; Karl Tuyls; Julien Perollat
- Headquarters: Paris, France
- Key people: Gautier Cloix (President, CEO)
- Number of employees: 90 (2026)
- Website: hcompany.ai

H Company, also known simply as H, is a French artificial intelligence startup which develops "action-oriented" artificial intelligence agents for enterprise automation and productivity. In May 2024, H Company closed a record-setting $220 million seed round, at the time the largest AI raise in Europe.

In 2026, H Company released Holo 3, the latest generation of its computer-use AI models. The update marked a major advance in agentic AI, enabling agents to navigate any user interface, interpret screens, and complete complex, multi-step tasks across enterprise systems—much like a human user.

== History ==
H Company was founded in 2023 in Paris by Laurent Sifre, Charles Kantor, and three DeepMind veterans: Daan Wiestra, Karl Tuyls, Julien Perollat. In May 2024, the firm secured what was then the largest European AI seed round, totaling $220 million led by US investors including Eric Schmidt (former Google CEO), Amazon, and backed by Accel, Bpifrance, UiPath, Eurazeo, Xavier Niel, Yuri Milner, Bernard Arnault, Samsung and others. In August 2024, three cofounders (Wiestra, Tuyls, Perollat) left the company over operational disagreements.

In November 2024, H launched Runner H, its first agentic-API platform, which combined a large language model (LLM) and a reduced, 2-billion parameter vision-language model (VLM). In May 2025, H Company acquired Mithril Security, and in June 2025 the company widened its offering for agentic models. In June 2025, Gautier Cloix (formerly CEO Palantir France) replaced Charles Kantor as CEO of H Company, aiming to pivot the company towards a "forward deployed engineers" model. In July 2025, H Company introduced Surfer-H-CLI, an open-source, web-native Chrome agent designed for browser-based automation—able to search, scroll, click, and type on behalf of users and controllable via any visual language model (VLM). When paired with its June 2025 open-sourced 3B-parameter Holo-1 model, Surfer-H-CLI achieved 92.2% WebVoyager benchmark accuracy.

== Activity ==
H Company develops AI agents capable of operating web, desktop and enterprise software through their user interfaces, without requiring dedicated APIs, in order to automate multi-step workflows. H Company specifically designs AI agents called computer use capable of autonomously interfacing with any software (local or cloud-based) to detect and automate repetitive operations.

H Company is based in Paris, France, with international offices in London and New York. H Company raised $220 million since its inception. Gautier Cloix is president and CEO of the company. H Company client include the French national lottery FDJ United.

In March 2026, H Company released Holo3, a family of artificial intelligence models designed to operate digital systems by interacting directly with user interfaces. Holo3 enables agents ("virtual humanoids") to understand what is displayed in front-end environments—such as web pages, desktop applications, and other graphical user interfaces—and perform actions such as clicking, typing, and navigating across them to complete multi-step tasks.

On the OSWorld-Verified benchmark, Holo3 reportedly achieved about 78.9%, surpassing the scores of OpenAI’s GPT‑5.4 and Anthropic’s Claude Opus 4.6 on this specific test, at roughly one-tenth of the inference cost of these proprietary systems. The release has been presented as a significant step toward automating routine digital workflows, allowing organizations to offload repetitive on-screen work, such as data entry and reconciliation across multiple tools, to AI-based agents.

In September 2026, H released Holo4, a family of computer-use models available in two versions: a 27-billion-parameter dense model and a 35-billion-parameter mixture-of-experts model. The models can operate software through its graphical interface, write and run code, and call tools through the Model Context Protocol or APIs; their weights are published on Hugging Face and they are also available through the company's API. According to the company, Holo4-27B scored 85.2% on the OSWorld benchmark. Alongside Holo4, H released Holotron4 Nano, a model built on Nvidia's Nemotron.
