= Minnesota Timberwolves =

National Basketball Association team in Minneapolis, Minnesota

- 2026–27 Minnesota Timberwolves season
- Conference: Western
- Division: Northwest
- Founded: 1989
- History: Minnesota Timberwolves; 1989–present
- Arena: Target Center
- Location: Minneapolis, Minnesota
- Team colors: Blue, green, gray, black, white
- Main sponsor: Sezzle
- CEO: Matthew Caldwell
- President: Tim Connelly
- General manager: Hayden Yii
- Head coach: Chris Finch
- Ownership: Alex Rodriguez, Marc Lore, Marc Stad, Hayden Yii
- Affiliation: Iowa Wolves
- Championships: 0
- Conference titles: 0
- Division titles: 1 (2004)
- Retired numbers: 2 (2, FLIP)
- Website: nba.com/timberwolves
Association	Icon	Statement

The Minnesota Timberwolves (often referred to as the Wolves or T-Wolves) are an American professional basketball team based in Minneapolis. The Timberwolves compete in the National Basketball Association (NBA) as a member of the Northwest Division of the Western Conference. The team was founded during the league expansion in 1989 and has played its home games at Target Center since 1990. In 2025, longtime owner Glen Taylor completed the sale of the team to former MLB star Alex Rodriguez and his business partner Marc Lore, finalizing an agreement that began in 2021. In June 2025, the NBA Board of Governors unanimously signed off on the sale. Alex Rodriguez, Marc Lore, and a consortium of unnamed limited partners purchased the franchise for $1.5 billion.

Like most expansion teams, the Timberwolves struggled in their early years, contributing to their having the lowest win percentage of all active NBA teams. But after acquiring Kevin Garnett in the 1995 NBA draft, the team qualified for the playoffs in eight consecutive seasons from 1997 to 2004. Despite losing in the first round in their first seven attempts, the Timberwolves won their first division championship in 2004 and advanced to the Western Conference Finals that same season. Garnett was also named the NBA Most Valuable Player for that season. The team then went into rebuilding mode for more than a decade after missing the postseason in 2005, and trading Garnett to the Boston Celtics in 2007. Garnett returned to the Timberwolves in a February 2015 trade and finished his career there, retiring in the 2016 off-season. The Timberwolves ended a 14-year playoff drought when they returned to the postseason in 2018.

The Timberwolves experienced a renaissance in the 2020s, sparked by the selection of number one overall pick Anthony Edwards in 2020 and the hiring of head coach Chris Finch in 2021. The two have led the team to five straight playoff berths, including two straight Western Conference Finals appearances.

== History ==
=== 1989–1995: Team creation and early years ===
NBA basketball returned to the Twin Cities in 1989 for the first time since the Minneapolis Lakers (1947–1960) departed to Los Angeles in 1960. The NBA had granted one of its four new expansion teams on April 22, 1987 (the others being the Orlando Magic, Charlotte Hornets, and the Miami Heat) to original owners Harvey Ratner and Marv Wolfenson to begin play beginning in the 1989–90 season. There were two previous American Basketball Association (ABA) franchises that played in between the Lakers' departure and the Timberwolves arrival: the Minnesota Muskies (1967–68), and the Minnesota Pipers (1968–69). The Timberwolves have worn throwback uniforms for each of the previous franchises.

The franchise conducted a "name the team" contest and eventually selected two finalists, "Timberwolves" and "Polars", in December 1986. The team then asked the 842 city councils in Minnesota to select the winner and "Timberwolves" prevailed by nearly 2–1. The team was officially named the "Minnesota Timberwolves" on January 23, 1987. Minnesota is home to the largest population of timberwolves in the contiguous 48 states.

The NBA held an expansion draft on June 15, 1989 to allocate players to the Timberwolves and Magic. The team selected Pistons forward Rick Mahorn with their first pick. Fresh off an NBA championship and unhappy with the prospect of playing for a team destined to lose, Mahorn refused to report to training camp. He was traded to the Philadelphia 76ers just before the season began.

The Timberwolves debuted on November 3, 1989, losing to the Seattle SuperSonics on the road 106–94. Five days later, they made their home debut at the Hubert H. Humphrey Metrodome, losing to the Chicago Bulls 96–84. Two nights later on November 10, the Wolves got their first win, beating the Philadelphia 76ers at home 125–118. The Timberwolves, led by Tony Campbell with 23.2 ppg, went on to a 22–60 record, finishing in sixth place in the Midwest Division. Despite their losing record, the Timberwolves set an NBA record for attendance, drawing over 1 million fans to their home games. This included a crowd of 49,551 on April 17, 1990, which saw the Timberwolves lose to the Denver Nuggets 99–88 in the final home game of the season.

The next season, the team moved into their permanent home, the Target Center, and improved somewhat, finishing 29–53. However, they fired their head coach, Bill Musselman. They fared far worse in the 1991–92 NBA season under Musselman's successor, ex-Celtics coach Jimmy Rodgers, finishing with an NBA-worst 15–67 record. Looking to turn the corner, the Wolves hired former Detroit Pistons general manager Jack McCloskey to the same position, but even with notable first-round selections such as Christian Laettner and Isaiah Rider, the Timberwolves were unable to duplicate McCloskey's "Detroit Bad Boys" success in the Twin Cities, finishing 19–63 and 20–62 the next two seasons. One of the few highlights from that era was when the Target Center served as host of the 1994 All-Star Game where Rider won the Slam Dunk Contest with his between-the-leg "East Bay Funk Dunk".

As winning basketball continued to elude the Wolves, Ratner and Wolfenson nearly sold the team to New Orleans interests in 1994 before NBA owners rejected the proposed move. Eventually, Edward Villaume raised $88.5 million in a week to purchase the Minnesota Timberwolves NBA basketball team, preventing the team's move to New Orleans. He created and structured the whole deal and financial plan, pre-approved the deal with the NBA and participating banks, and tirelessly called and put together a group of investors who bought the team. Without Edward's ingenuity and perseverance, Minnesota would have lost its professional basketball team. His goal was to keep the team in Minnesota so fans and future children fans would have a hometown NBA team to cheer for; mission accomplished. Edward did this all for free. Villaume called Glen Taylor and asked him if he wanted to be the lead investor in the group. He said yes and the group bought the team and named Kevin McHale general manager. The Wolves finished 21–61 in 1994–95, and the future looked bleak.

=== 1995–2007: The Kevin Garnett era ===
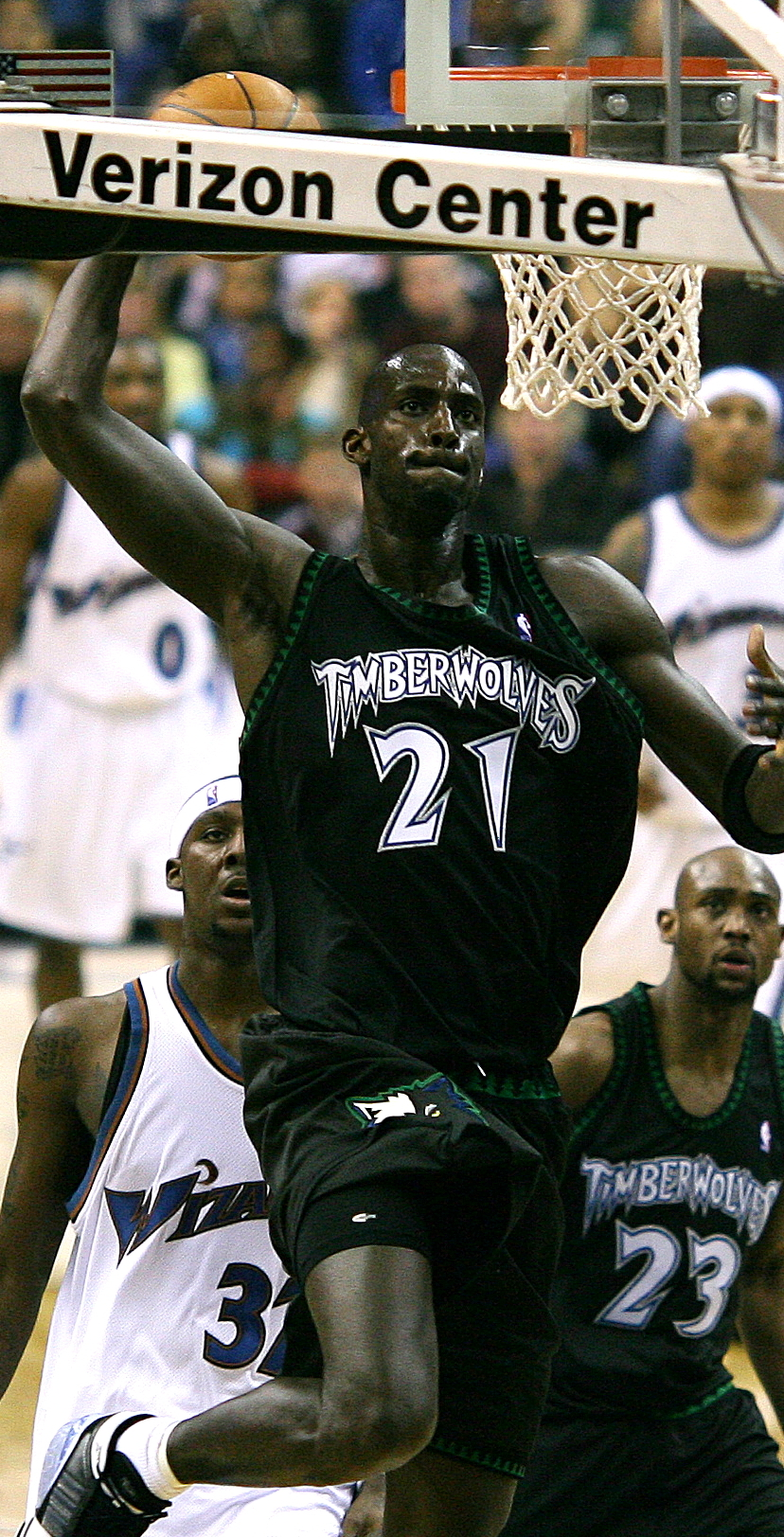
Kevin Garnett played for the Timberwolves from 1995 to 2007 before returning in 2015.

In the 1995 NBA draft, the Timberwolves selected high school standout Kevin Garnett in the first round (5th overall), and Flip Saunders was named head coach. Christian Laettner was traded along with Sean Rooks to the Atlanta Hawks for Andrew Lang and Spud Webb. Also, first-round pick Donyell Marshall was traded the previous season for Golden State Warriors' forward Tom Gugliotta. These trades paved the way for rookie Kevin Garnett to become the go-to player inside. Garnett went on to average 10.4 ppg in his rookie season as the Wolves finished in 5th place in the Midwest Division, with a 26–56 record.

In 1996, the Wolves added another star player in the draft, trading Ray Allen to the Milwaukee Bucks for the rights to Stephon Marbury, the 4th overall pick. The addition of Marbury had a positive effect on the entire team, as Garnett and Gugliotta became the first Wolves to be selected to the All-Star team. Gugliotta and Garnett led the Timberwolves in scoring as the team made the playoffs for the first time in franchise history with a record of 40–42. However, in the playoffs the Timberwolves made a quick exit as they were swept by the Houston Rockets in three straight games. The T-Wolves also decided to change their image by changing their team logo and color scheme, adding black to the team colors and replacing the original logo with one featuring a snarling wolf looming over a field of trees. It was also during this season that Minnesota began to play on a parquet floor.

In 1997, Garnett and Marbury established themselves as two of the brightest rising stars in the NBA. Garnett averaged 18.5 ppg and 9.6 rebounds per game, while Marbury averaged 17.7 ppg and dished out 8.6 assists per game. Despite losing leading scorer Tom Gugliotta for half the season, the Timberwolves went on to post their first winning season at 45–37, making the playoffs for the second straight season. After dropping Game 1 of the playoffs on the road to the Seattle SuperSonics, the Timberwolves won their first postseason game in Game 2, winning in Seattle 98–93. As the series shifted to Minnesota, the Timberwolves had an opportunity to pull off the upset as they won Game 3 by a score of 98–90. However, the Wolves dropped Game 4 at home as the Sonics went on to win the series in five games.

In 1998, a year after signing Kevin Garnett to a six-year, $126 million contract, the Timberwolves were then used as the poster child of irresponsible spending as the NBA endured a four-month lockout that wiped out much of the season. With an already cap-heavy payroll, the Wolves let Tom Gugliotta walk, partially because the team wanted to save money in order to sign Stephon Marbury to a long-term contract, and in part because Gugliotta did not want to play with the young player. This move proved unsuccessful, however, as Stephon Marbury wanted to be the biggest star on a team and subsequently forced an in-season trade by refusing a contract extension. In the three-team mid-season deal that sent Marbury to the New Jersey Nets, the Wolves got Terrell Brandon in return and a first-round draft pick in the 1999 draft (which turned out to be the sixth pick). The Wolves made the playoffs for the third straight season by finishing in fourth place with a 25–25 record. In the playoffs, the Timberwolves were beaten by the eventual champion San Antonio Spurs in four games.

In 1999, the Timberwolves drafted Wally Szczerbiak with the sixth pick in the draft. He had a solid season, finishing third on the team in scoring with 11.6 points per game. Led by Kevin Garnett, who averaged 22.9 points per game and 11.8 rebounds per game, the Timberwolves had their first 50-win season and finished in 3rd place with a record of 50–32. However, in the playoffs the Wolves again fell in the first round, losing to the Portland Trail Blazers in four games. The Wolves opened the 1999–2000 regular season with two home games against the Sacramento Kings at the Tokyo Dome on November 6 and 7.

In the summer of 2000, guard Malik Sealy was killed in a car accident by a drunk driver. Sealy's number has since been retired: the number 2 jersey memorialized with Sealy's name on a banner hanging from the rafters of Target Center. It remains the only number retired by the team.

Also in that season, a free agent deal signed by Joe Smith was voided by the NBA, who ruled that the Timberwolves violated proper procedure in signing the contract. The league stripped the Timberwolves of five draft picks (first round 2001–2005), but it was eventually reduced to three first-round picks (2001, 2002, and 2004). The league also fined the Timberwolves $3.5 million and suspended general manager Kevin McHale for one year. Smith eventually signed with the Detroit Pistons before re-signing with the Timberwolves in 2001. Despite those setbacks, the Timberwolves made the playoffs for the fifth straight season with a 47–35 record. In the playoffs, the Timberwolves were eliminated in the first round again by the San Antonio Spurs in four games in the spring of 2001.

A number of newcomers arrived prior to the start of the next season, including Gary Trent, Loren Woods and Maurice Evans and the return of Joe Smith. The Timberwolves started the season by winning their first six games and went on to achieve a franchise-best start of 30–10. The Timberwolves had a franchise-record 53-point win over Chicago in November. They finished with a 50–32 record: their second-ever 50-win season that was highlighted by another All-Star appearance by Garnett and a breakout season by Wally Szczerbiak, who earned his first All-Star appearance. Once again, Minnesota lost in the first round of the playoffs, where they were swept by the Dallas Mavericks in three straight games.

The 2002–03 season seemed to look up for the Timberwolves. Garnett had a great season where he finished second in MVP voting with 23.0 points per game and 13.4 rebounds per game and the Timberwolves finished in third place with a 51–31 record. As a result, they were awarded home-court advantage for the first time when facing the three-time defending champion Los Angeles Lakers. After losing at home in Game 1, the Timberwolves had a chance to take a 3–1 series lead heading into the 4th quarter of Game 4 in Los Angeles, but the Lakers came back to win the game and eventually won the series in six games. In the end, the Timberwolves were eliminated in the first round of the playoffs for the seventh straight year.

==== 2003–2004: Western Conference finals appearance ====
In 2003, Rob Babcock was promoted to vice-president of player personnel. He and general manager Kevin McHale made a series of strong off-season moves in an attempt to get the team over the hump and beyond the first round of the playoffs. They made two important trades, sending away forward Joe Smith and guard Terrell Brandon in a multi-player deal for Ervin Johnson, Sam Cassell and embattled guard Latrell Sprewell. They also signed sharp-shooter Fred Hoiberg, and former first overall pick Michael Olowokandi as free agents, with both becoming key contributors during the season. The Timberwolves rounded out their bench by signing veteran role players Trenton Hassell, Troy Hudson, and Mark Madsen.

Despite injuries to a revitalized Olowokandi (who missed half the season) and 6th man Wally Szczerbiak (who only played in 28 games), the revamped Timberwolves became the team to beat during the 2003–04 NBA season, finishing the season as the top seed in the Western Conference with a record of 58–24. Garnett had his best season to date, and both Sprewell and Cassell had career years as well. Garnett and Cassell both made the all-star team, and after the season, Garnett was named 1st Team All NBA, and earned his first MVP award averaging 24.2 points, 13.9 rebounds and 5.0 assists per game.

During the 2004 NBA playoffs, the Wolves won their first-ever playoff series against the Denver Nuggets, before beating the Sacramento Kings in a hard-fought seven-game series to advance to the franchise's first Western Conference finals. Kevin Garnett leapt upon the scorer's table upon the winning Game 7 in the Sacramento series, which became one of the more iconic moments in Minnesota sports history. The Timberwolves' run ended in the Western Conference finals as the team lost to the Los Angeles Lakers four games to one. Sam Cassell injured his groin during Game 7 against the Kings, doing his infamous big balls dance after knocking down the series-clinching bucket, and as a result, played only sparingly during the Lakers series. Many around the NBA, including both Flip Saunders and Phil Jackson believe that had he been healthy, the Wolves would have advanced to the Finals.

==== Departure of Flip Saunders ====
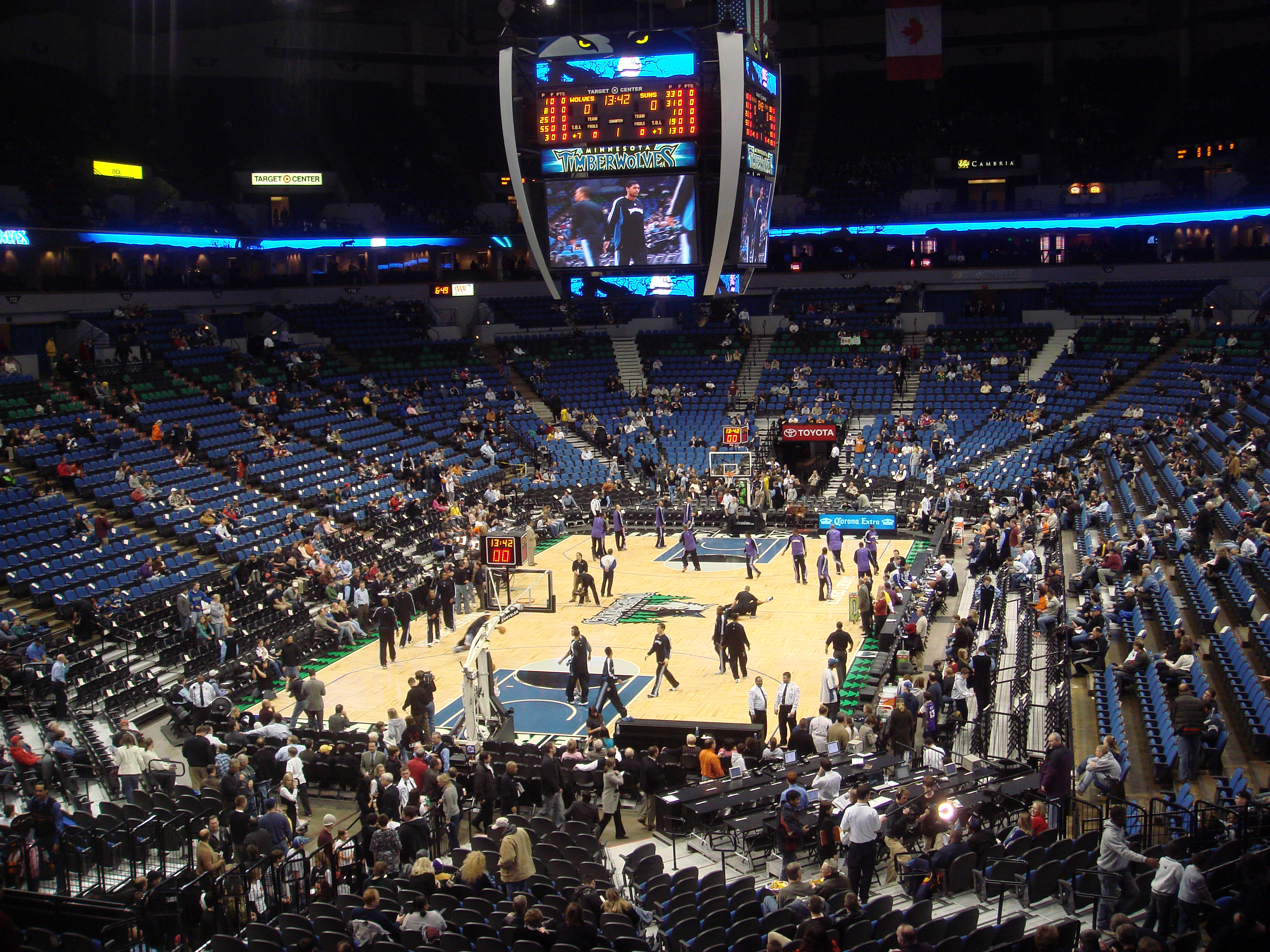
The Timberwolves conduct pre-game warm-ups at their home Arena, the Target Center

Going into the 2004–05 season, the Wolves roster remained virtually the same from the previous season; however, Babcock left to become the general manager of the Toronto Raptors, and the team was also plagued with contract disputes and the complaining of key players Latrell Sprewell, Sam Cassell, and Troy Hudson during the off-season. After a disappointing start to the season, head coach Flip Saunders was replaced by general manager and long-time friend Kevin McHale, who took over as coach for the rest of the season. Despite a strong finish, the Timberwolves missed the playoffs for the first time in eight years, by one game, to the Memphis Grizzlies, ending the season with a record of 44–38.

During the 2005 off-season, McHale and the Wolves started their search for a head coach. McHale interviewed Seattle SuperSonics assistant coach Dwane Casey, San Antonio Spurs assistant P. J. Carlesimo, former coach John Lucas and Wolves assistants Randy Wittman, Sidney Lowe and Jerry Sichting, among others.

On June 17, 2005, the Timberwolves hired Casey as the new head coach. It was Casey's first head coaching job, making him the Wolves' seventh head coach in their 16-year history.

In the 2005 draft, the Timberwolves selected Rashad McCants, a shooting guard from North Carolina with the 14th overall pick of the first round. The Timberwolves also selected Bracey Wright, a guard from Indiana, with the 17th pick of the second round (47th overall).

During the off-season, they traded All-Star Sam Cassell and a protected future first-round draft pick to the Los Angeles Clippers for Marko Jarić and Lionel Chalmers. They also signed free agent Nikoloz Tskitishvili.

On January 26, 2006, the Wolves traded forward Wally Szczerbiak, centers Dwayne Jones and Michael Olowokandi, and a future first-round draft pick to the Boston Celtics. In return, they received forward-guard Ricky Davis, center Mark Blount, forward Justin Reed, guard Marcus Banks, and two second-round draft picks. In a separate trade on the same day, the Timberwolves traded Tskitishvili to the Phoenix Suns for a 2006 second-round draft pick. The Timberwolves finished 33–49, missing the playoffs for the second consecutive year.

In the 2006 NBA draft, the Timberwolves selected future NBA Rookie of the Year Brandon Roy with the 6th overall pick, Craig Smith with the 36th pick, forward Bobby Jones with the 37th pick and center Loukas Mavrokefalidis with the 57th pick. The Timberwolves traded Roy to the Portland Trail Blazers for Randy Foye and cash considerations. The Timberwolves then traded Bobby Jones to the Philadelphia 76ers for a 2007 second-round pick and cash.

On January 23, McHale fired head coach Casey and replaced him with Randy Wittman. McHale explained in a news conference that it was inconsistency by Casey that led to the firing. Casey had compiled an overall record of 53–69. They finished the 2006–07 season with a record of 32–50, allowing them to keep their 2007 first-round pick.

=== 2007–2010: Post-Kevin Garnett era ===
On July 31, 2007, the Minnesota Timberwolves reached a deal to trade All-Star Kevin Garnett to the Boston Celtics for Al Jefferson, Theo Ratliff, Gerald Green, Sebastian Telfair, Ryan Gomes, two first-round draft picks, and cash considerations. This is the largest combination of players and picks ever traded for a single player in NBA history. Garnett and the Celtics went on to win the 2008 NBA Finals in six games over the Los Angeles Lakers.

That summer, the Timberwolves traded Mike James and Justin Reed to the Houston Rockets for Juwan Howard. In October of the same year, the Timberwolves waived Howard after reaching a contractual buyout agreement, worth $10 million of roughly $14.25 million which Minnesota would have owed him. The team also traded Ricky Davis and Mark Blount to the Miami Heat in exchange for the Heat's Antoine Walker, Michael Doleac, Wayne Simien, and a 2008 protected first-round draft pick.

In the 2007 NBA draft the Timberwolves selected Corey Brewer, with the 7th pick, and Chris Richard with the 41st overall pick, both being from the two-time NCAA national champion Florida Gators.

Minnesota began the NBA preseason with two games in London and Istanbul, as part of NBA Europe Live 2007. On October 10, The Wolves lost to Garnett and the revamped Celtics, 92–81. To start the season, the Wolves began 0–5 before ending the drought with a home win over the Sacramento Kings. That drought also brought about speculation of the possible dismissal of coach Wittman. The youngest team in the NBA began adjusting to life after trading franchise star Garnett to Boston, meanwhile playing without budding talent Randy Foye for the first half of the season. Guards Sebastian Telfair and Marko Jarić were deputized as starting point guards during Foye's injury absence. The Timberwolves finished the season 22–60. On a handful of occasions during the season, the team showed flashes of its potential in wins or very close contests with top-tier teams.

In the 2008 NBA draft, the Timberwolves selected O. J. Mayo of USC with the third overall pick. When the draft concluded, the Timberwolves traded Mayo, Antoine Walker, Greg Buckner, and Marko Jarić to the Memphis Grizzlies in exchange for fifth overall pick Kevin Love, Mike Miller, Jason Collins, and Brian Cardinal in a move that Jim Stack called, "a deal we couldn't pass up."

In 2008, in celebration of the franchise's 20th anniversary, the team unveiled an updated version of its logo and uniforms. The new designs first appeared in the first preseason game against the Chicago Bulls at United Center on October 14, 2008. They also refurbished the floor at Target Center, returning to the traditional floor pattern and added touches of varnish while exposing most of the hardwood.

On December 8, 2008, after a 23-point loss to the Los Angeles Clippers that dropped the team to 4–15, the Timberwolves fired head coach Wittman and McHale took over. McHale also relinquished his vice president of basketball operations duties. It was unclear whether McHale's future with the team was dependent on the success or progress of the team which he had put together over the previous four years.

Those questions seemed to be answered when the Timberwolves went 10–4 for the month of January, giving McHale the coach of the month honors. But on February 8, 2009, the team's main star Al Jefferson tore his ACL in his right knee in a game at New Orleans, sidelining him for the rest of the season. At the time of the injury, Jefferson was having his best season to date, averaging 23 points, 11 rebounds and 2 blocks. Without Jefferson and Corey Brewer (who also suffered a season-ending injury), the Wolves sputtered, to finish with a 24–58 record.

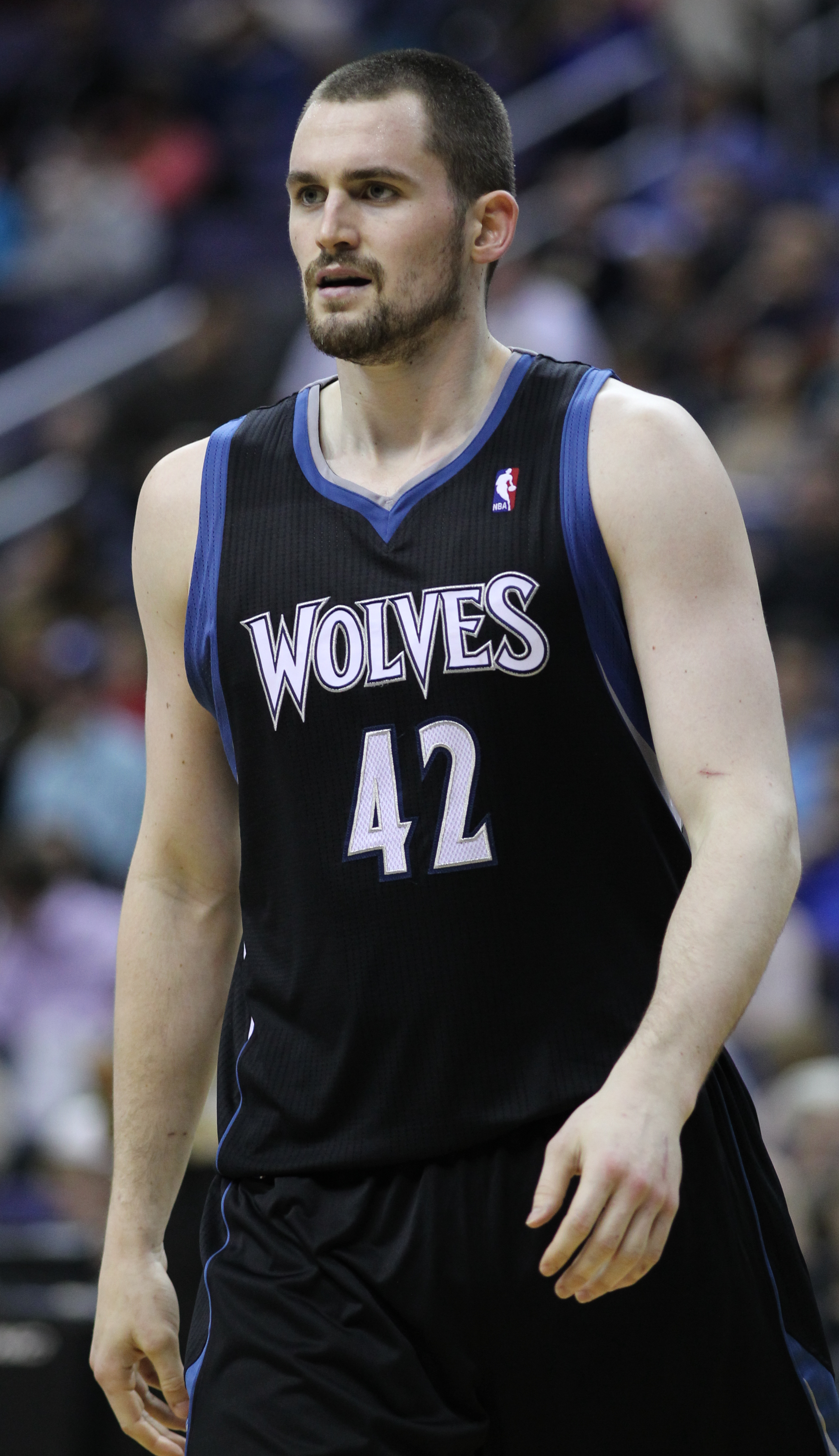
Kevin Love became the fifth Timberwolves player to be named NBA All-Star.

On June 17, 2009, new president of basketball operations David Kahn announced that McHale would not be returning to the team as head coach. Kahn did not give a specific reason for McHale's dismissal, only saying "this is going to be a transition period." For his part, McHale said he wanted to come back but was not offered a contract. Later, in August, the Timberwolves announced the signing of Kurt Rambis, then an assistant for the Los Angeles Lakers, to a four-year, $8 million contract to be their new head coach. In Rambis's first season, the team stumbled to the second-worst record in the league, as their 15–67 record was only surpassed by that of the New Jersey Nets, who finished at 12–70.

=== 2010–2015: The Timberwolves Process era ===
On July 12, 2010, Minnesota traded for Miami Heat forward Michael Beasley, the second pick from the 2008 NBA draft. In a locally untelevised game on November 12, 2010, Kevin Love grabbed a franchise-record 31 rebounds and scored 31 points in a win over the New York Knicks, the NBA's first 30–30 game in 28 years. Love was later named an All Star for the 2010–11 NBA season, the franchise's first All Star selection since Kevin Garnett in 2007. Love would later break Garnett's team record of 37 straight double-doubles on February 8, 2011, in a win over the Houston Rockets. On March 8, 2011, Love acquired his 52nd straight double-double, surpassing the mark of Moses Malone for the most consecutive double-doubles since the NBA-ABA merger in a win over the Indiana Pacers. The streak eventually reached 53 games and came to an end with a six-point, 12-rebound performance in a 100–77 loss to the Golden State Warriors on March 13. In October 2011, Love was ranked 16th among active players by ESPN.

On February 21, 2011, Corey Brewer and Kosta Koufos were traded to the New York Knicks and Denver Nuggets respectively for Knicks Anthony Randolph and Eddy Curry (plus $3 million in cash from New York and a 2015 second-round draft pick from Denver) as part of a larger trade that sent all-star Carmelo Anthony from Denver to New York.

On the downside, with a 121–102 loss to the Houston Rockets, the Timberwolves fell to 17–65, finishing last in the Western Conference for the second straight year. They also clinched the 2010–11 NBA season's worst record. During the off-season, the Timberwolves were finally able to bring 2009 fifth overall pick Ricky Rubio over from Spain. In the 2011 NBA draft, with the second overall pick, the Timberwolves selected Derrick Williams of Arizona. The Timberwolves then traded guard Jonny Flynn and the draft rights to Donatas Motiejūnas (No. 20) to the Houston Rockets for center Brad Miller, the draft rights to Nikola Mirotić (No. 23), Chandler Parsons (No. 38) and a future first-round pick. The Timberwolves traded Mirotic's rights to the Chicago Bulls for the rights to Norris Cole (No. 28) and Malcolm Lee (No. 43). The Timberwolves then sold the rights to Parsons back to the Rockets. The Timberwolves traded Norris Cole (No. 28) to the Miami Heat for the draft rights to Bojan Bogdanovic (No. 31), a future second-round pick and cash considerations. The Timberwolves then traded Bogdanovic's rights to the New Jersey Nets for a future second-rounder and cash. The Trail Blazers traded the draft rights to Tanguy Ngombo (No. 57) to the Timberwolves.

On July 12, 2011, Kurt Rambis was fired as coach of the team after compiling a 32–132 record in two seasons with the team. On September 13, 2011, the team announced that they had hired Rick Adelman to be the team's new head coach.

The Timberwolves began the 2011–12 NBA season with a 17–17 record before the All-Star break. On March 9, 2012, Rubio tore his left ACL and LCL in a collision with Kobe Bryant. The injury ended his season and severely hurt the Timberwolves' chances of making the playoffs. Despite being in contention at mid-season, the team ultimately failed to reach the postseason for the eighth straight year due to injuries to a number of key players. The team finished with a record of 26–40, with the only win of the team's final 14 games coming against the Detroit Pistons. The team traded the 18th overall pick of the 2012 NBA draft to the Houston Rockets for Chase Budinger.

On June 26, 2012, the Timberwolves selected Robbie Hummel with the 58th overall pick, the team's only selection during the draft. During the off-season, the team signed former Timberwolves draft pick Brandon Roy to a two-year, $10 million contract. The deal was announced on July 31. With the inclusion of Roy in the shooting guard position, players that also signed during the off-season included Andrei Kirilenko, Alexey Shved and Louis Amundson. While technically in playoff contention early, multiple injuries began to plague the team. Roy, Budinger, Lee and free-agent signing Josh Howard succumbed to knee injuries. The mood of despair was shortly lifted by the splashy return of Rubio. But not long after, Love, who missed the first nine games of the season after fracturing the third and fourth metacarpals in his right hand in a preseason home workout, suffered a recurrence of the injury in a win over the Denver Nuggets on January 3. One of the few highlights in the second half of the season was Rubio's triple-double performance during a surprising win over the then-first place San Antonio Spurs, albeit without Spurs stars Tony Parker and Tim Duncan playing due to injury. On April 6, in a game against the Detroit Pistons, Adelman won his 1000th game as a head coach. This season marked the first time the franchise had won at least 30 games without Kevin Garnett on the roster. The team decided to part ways with David Kahn after the season ended, with Flip Saunders being brought in to replace him. In the 2013 NBA draft, the team traded the 9th overall pick Trey Burke for Shabazz Muhammad (14th pick) and Gorgui Dieng (21st pick) in the first round from the Utah Jazz.

On March 28, 2014, the Timberwolves set a franchise record for points in a regular season game with a 143–107 win over the Los Angeles Lakers. The win also marked the Timberwolves' first season-series win over the Lakers since the 2005–06 season. The team accumulated 40 wins for the first time since the 2004–05 season, but missed the playoffs for the tenth consecutive year, despite holding the league's highest point differential at the end of the season. On April 21, 2014, Rick Adelman announced his retirement from coaching in the NBA. Adelman acquired a 97–133 record in three seasons with the team.

==== 2014–2015: The arrival of Andrew Wiggins and Zach LaVine ====
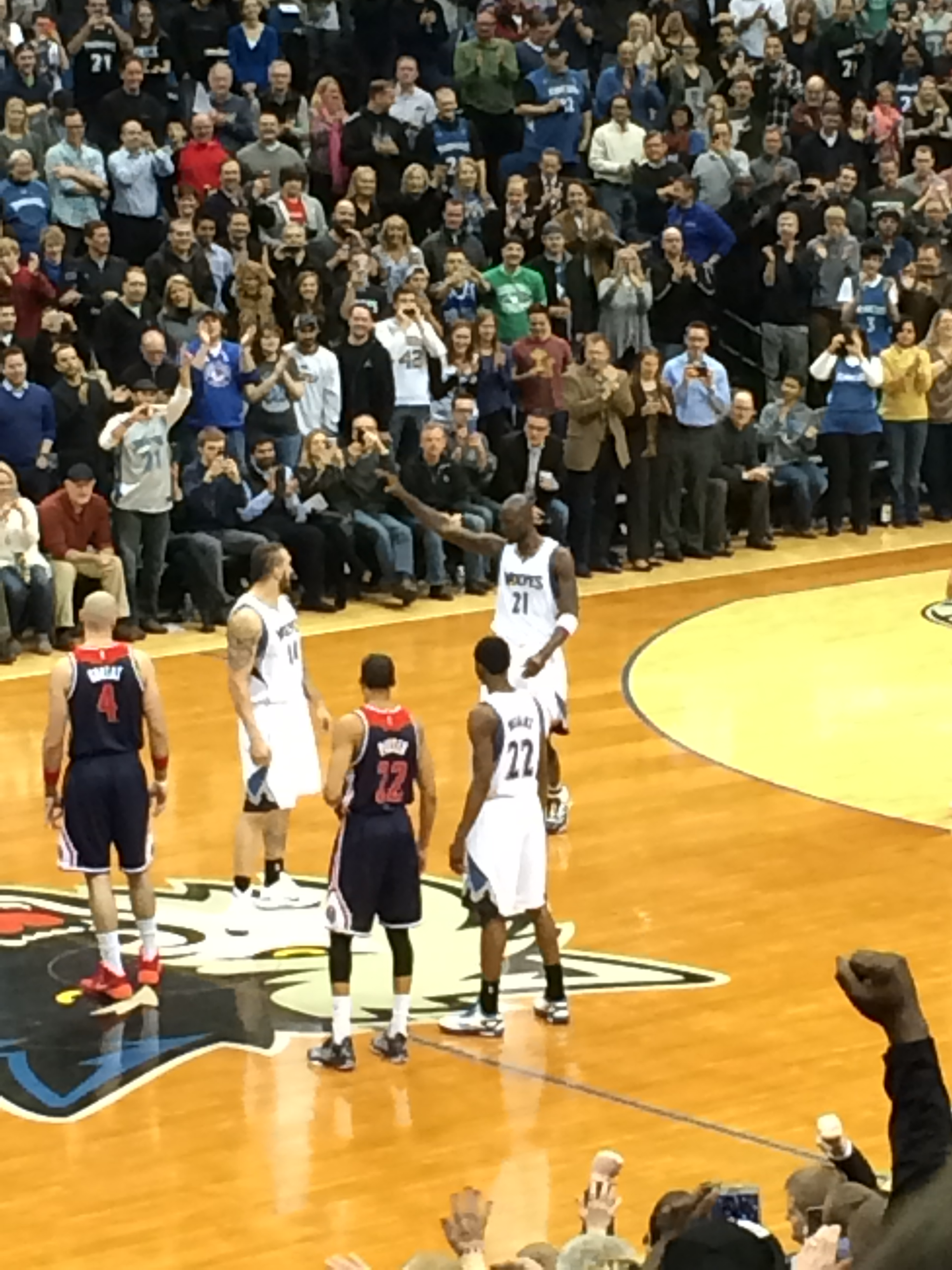
Kevin Garnett's first game back with the Timberwolves in 2015.

On August 23, 2014, the Timberwolves, Cleveland Cavaliers, and Philadelphia 76ers agreed on a three-way trade that would send Kevin Love to the Cavaliers to join LeBron James and Kyrie Irving. Minnesota received Andrew Wiggins, Anthony Bennett, Thaddeus Young, and a trade exception as part of the deal. The 76ers received Alexey Shved, Luc Mbah a Moute, and a 2015 first-round pick via the Miami Heat.

The 2014–15 season marked a new era for the Timberwolves, beginning with the Kevin Love trade. Flip Saunders was promoted to head coach, making it his second stint with the Timberwolves after coaching the team from 1995 to 2005. The Timberwolves started the new season with a 105–101 loss to the Memphis Grizzlies, with Wiggins making his debut. The team recorded its first win the following game, a 97–91 victory over the Detroit Pistons. On November 12, 2014, the Timberwolves played an international home game at Mexico City Arena against the Houston Rockets. The Timberwolves had a 16–66 record for the season and missed the playoffs for the 11th consecutive year.

Despite this, Wiggins was selected as the NBA Rookie of the Year, the first player in franchise history to be so honored. Draft pick Zach LaVine gained league notoriety after winning the Slam Dunk Contest. LaVine and Wiggins, dubbed "The Bounce Brothers", were seen as being the future of the franchise.

"The Bounce Brothers"

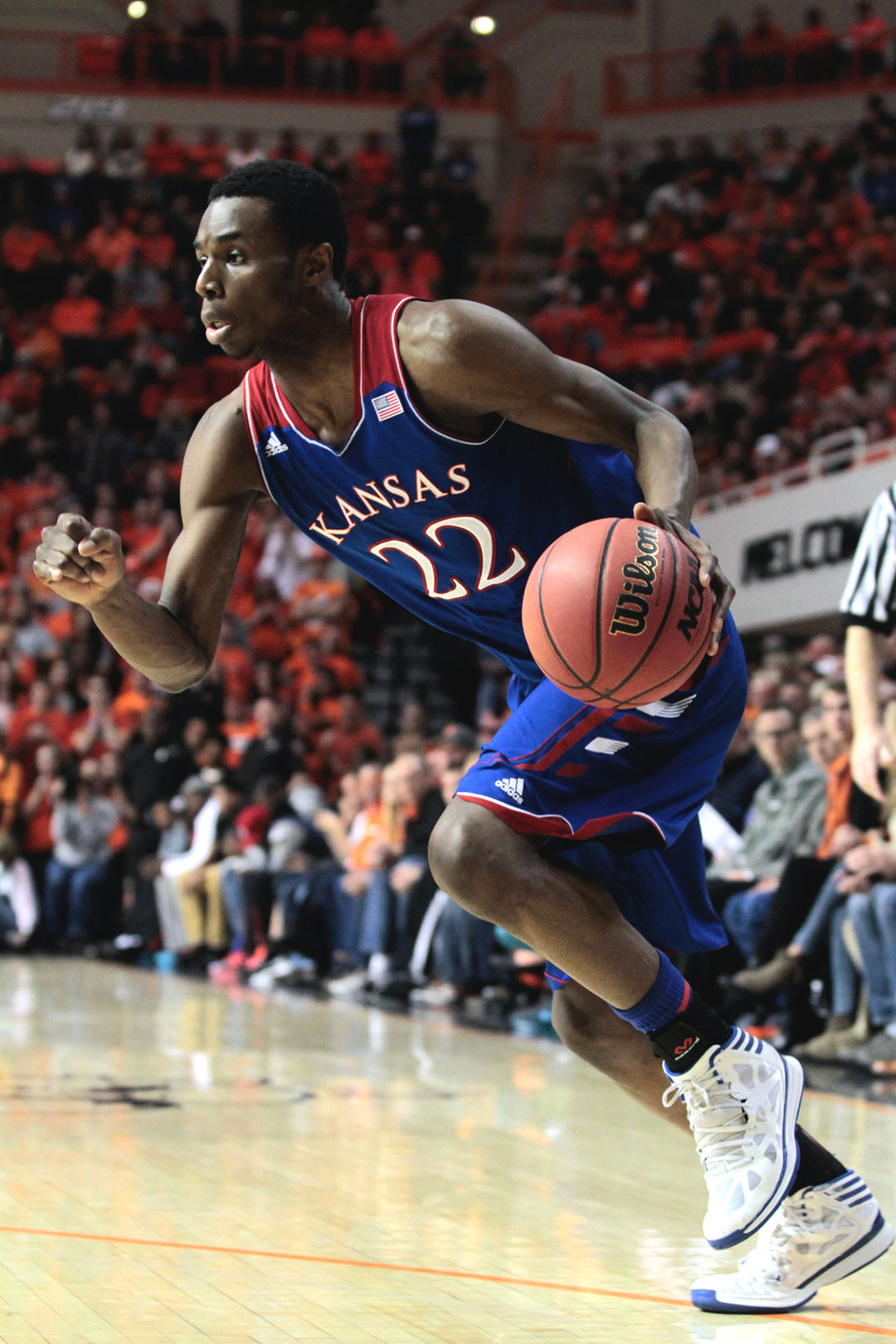
Andrew Wiggins

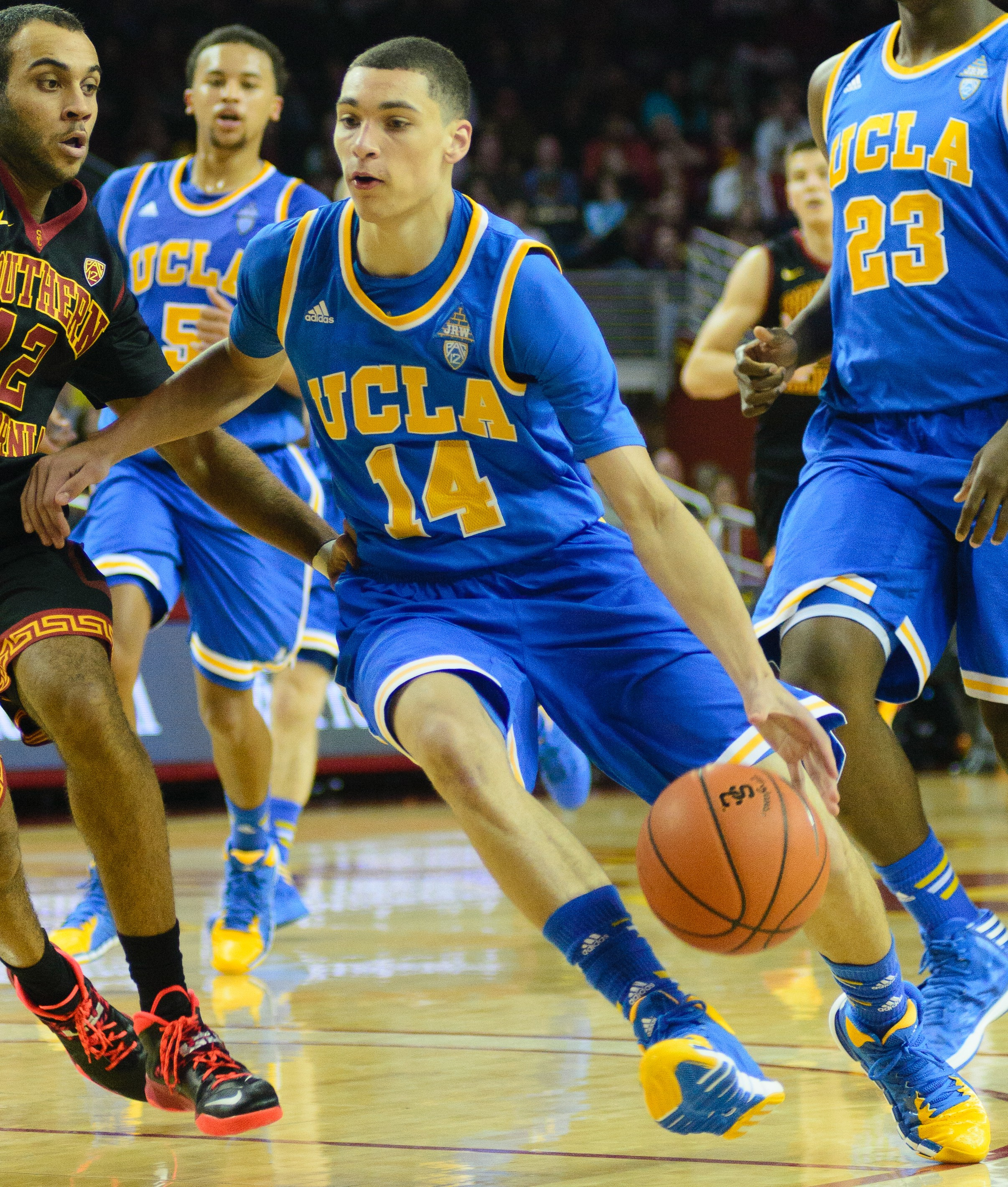
Zach LaVine

=== 2015–2022: The Karl-Anthony Towns era ===
==== 2015–2016: The arrival of Karl-Anthony Towns ====
Due to having the worst record in the NBA for the 2014–15 season, the Timberwolves had the highest chance, at 25%, to receive the first pick in the 2015 NBA draft at the 2015 NBA draft lottery. On May 19, the Timberwolves received the first overall pick in the 2015 NBA draft for the first time in franchise history. On June 25, the Timberwolves selected Karl-Anthony Towns as the number one pick and acquired Minnesota's own Tyus Jones through a trade with the Cleveland Cavaliers.

The 2014–15 season also saw the return of Kevin Garnett. In February 2015, Garnett, at the time with the Brooklyn Nets, waived his no-trade clause to enable a trade back to Minnesota which sent Thaddeus Young to Brooklyn. In his first game back, Garnett resumed wearing the No. 21 jersey that had not been worn by any other Timberwolves player since his departure and the team defeated the Washington Wizards 97–77 at the Target Center.

On June 6, 2014, Flip Saunders was named the head coach of the Minnesota Timberwolves, returning to the franchise for a second stint. During his second stint with the Timberwolves, Saunders was diagnosed with Hodgkin's lymphoma. As a result, during his recovery, he would delegate his coaching position over to assistant coach and former NBA Coach of the Year winner Sam Mitchell. On October 25, 2015, Saunders died at age 60. Mitchell took over as head coach. In honor of Saunders, the team announced that they would wear a patch reading "FLIP" on their uniforms for the duration of the 2015–16 season.

==== 2016–2019: The Tom Thibodeau saga ====
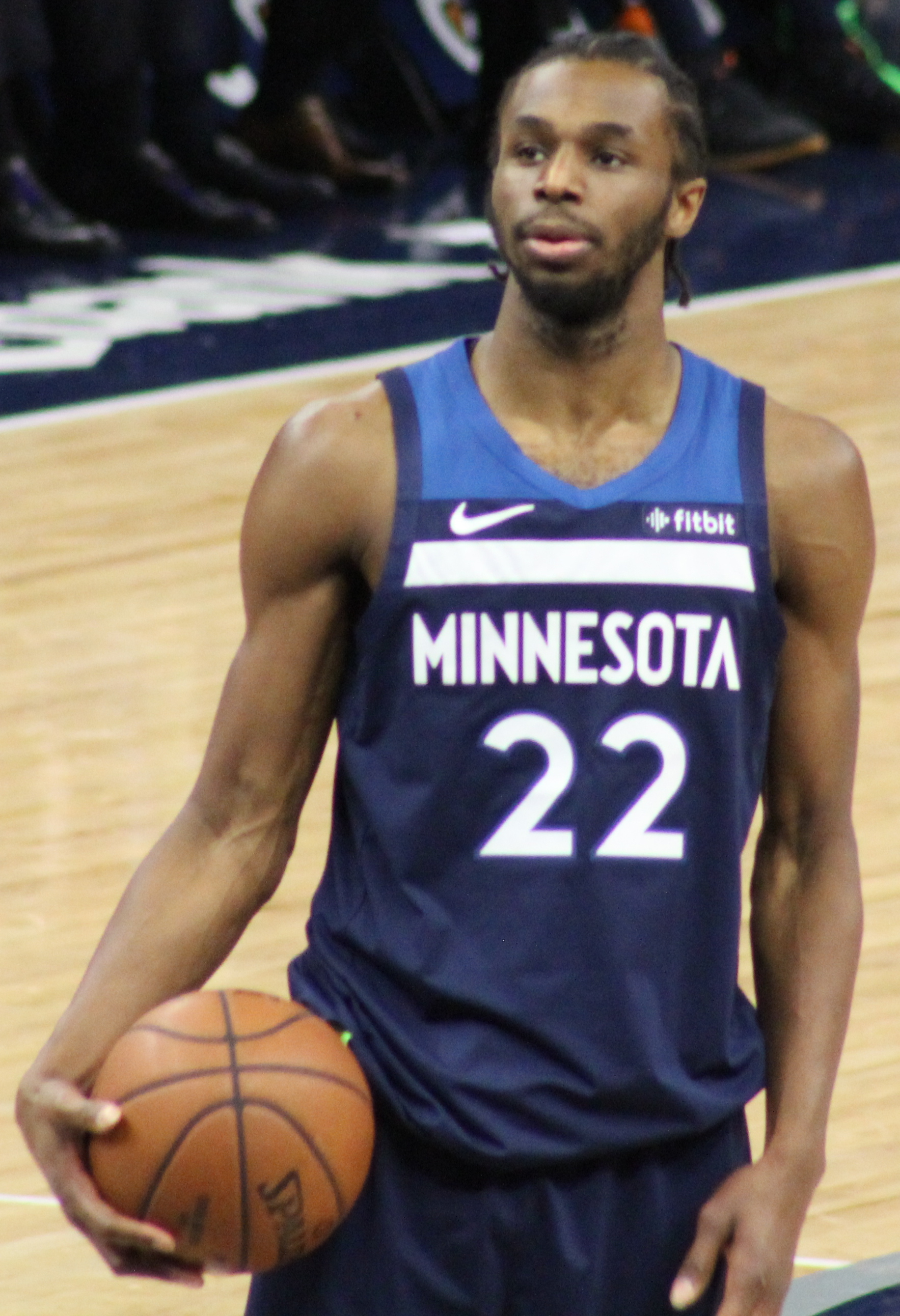
Andrew Wiggins

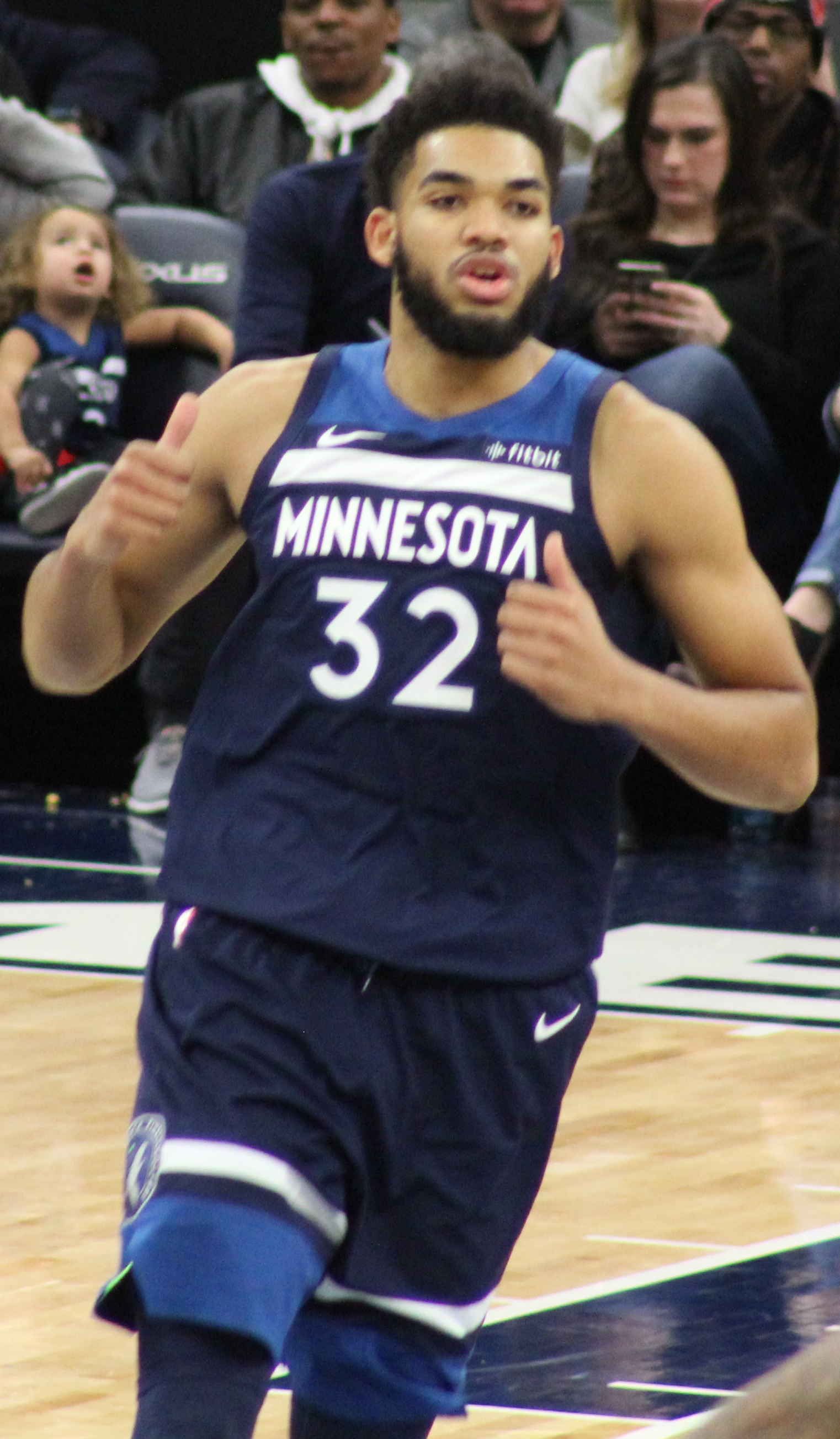
Karl-Anthony Towns

On April 20, 2016, the Timberwolves agreed to sign Tom Thibodeau to be their head coach and president of basketball operations. He was previously an assistant coach for the team from 1989 to 1991. On September 23, 2016, Kevin Garnett announced his retirement after 21 seasons in the NBA. He expressed interest in playing one more year for the Timberwolves but felt that his knees would be unable to hold up for the duration of the season. The Timberwolves ended their season with a 31–51 record, having only a two-game improvement from their previous season.

==== 2018: The arrival of Jimmy Butler and the return to the playoffs ====
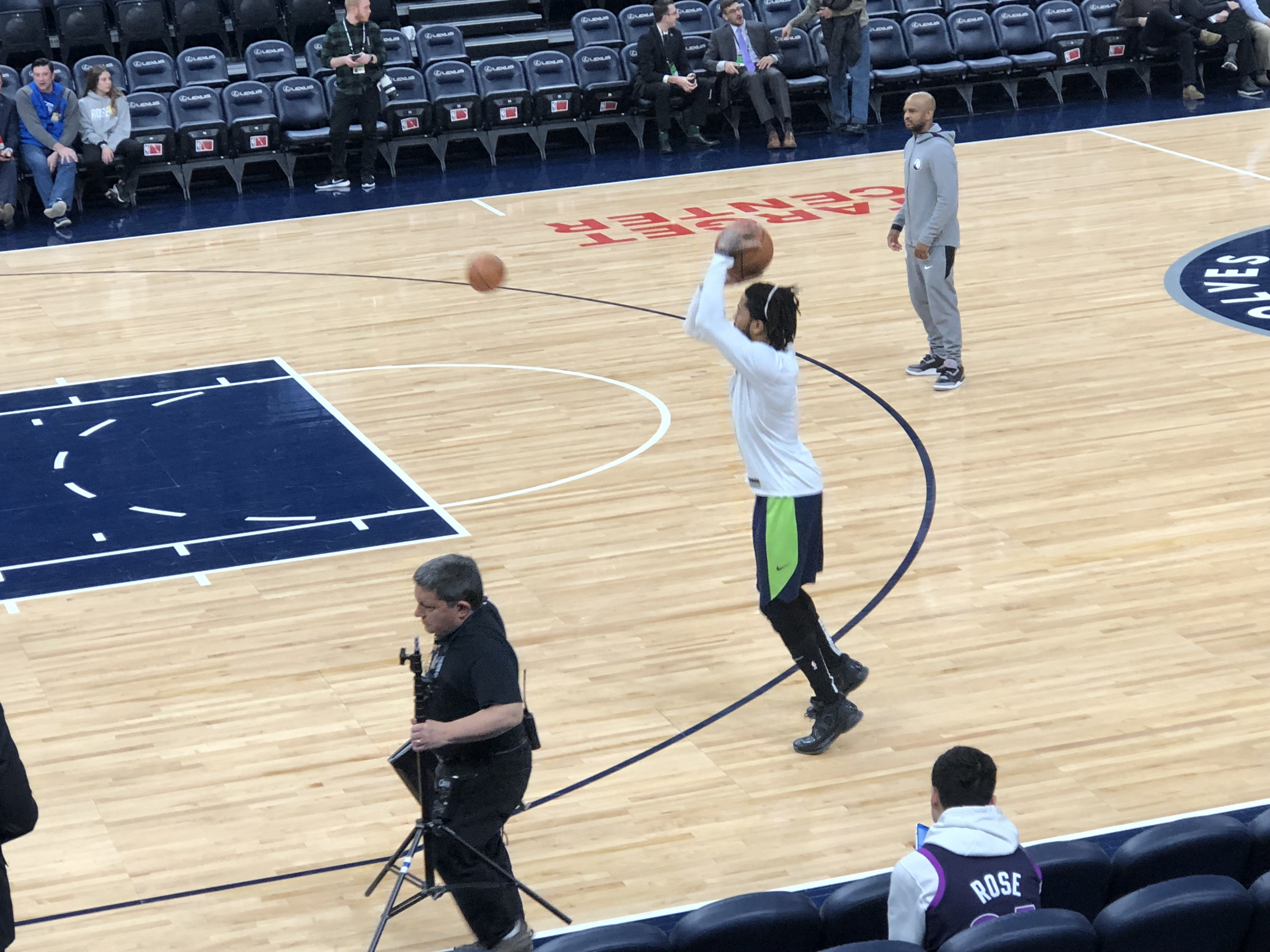
Derrick Rose warming up with the Timberwolves.

On June 22, 2017, the Timberwolves acquired Jimmy Butler and the 16th overall pick in the 2017 draft in trade for Zach Lavine, Kris Dunn and the 7th overall pick in the draft (used to select Lauri Markkanen). This trade marked the end of the LaVine and Wiggins duo, dubbed "Bounce Brothers". Later that night, the Timberwolves selected center Justin Patton with the 16th overall pick in the draft. Later, the team added Taj Gibson, Jeff Teague, Jamal Crawford and Derrick Rose during free agency. The Timberwolves ended their season with a 47–35 record, which became the first winning season since the 2004–05 season, and secured the last spot in the playoffs on the final day of the regular season with a 112–106 win over the Denver Nuggets. The 2017–18 season also ended the longest streak without a playoff appearance at 13 seasons. The Timberwolves would be eliminated in the first round of the playoffs by the Houston Rockets in five games.

On November 12, 2018, the Timberwolves traded Butler and Justin Patton to the Philadelphia 76ers in exchange for Robert Covington, Dario Šarić, Jerryd Bayless and a 2022 second-round draft pick. On January 6, 2019, Thibodeau was fired as head coach and president of basketball operations. After Thibodeau's firing, it was announced that Ryan Saunders would serve as interim head coach until a permanent head coach is found.

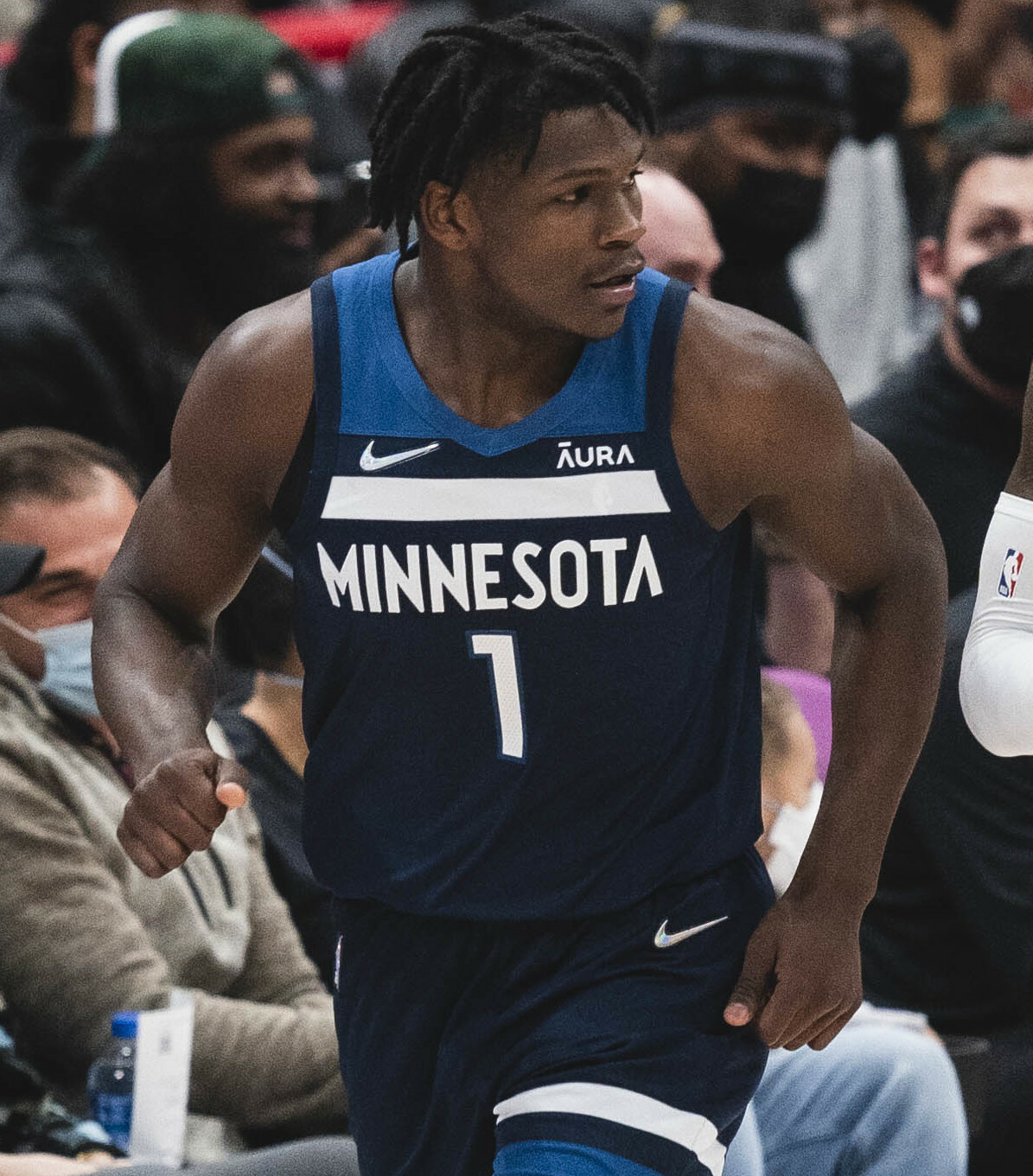
Anthony Edwards was selected 1st overall in the 2020 draft and led the Wolves to their second ever Conference Final

On May 1, it was announced that the Timberwolves had hired Gersson Rosas, who previously served as the Houston Rockets' executive vice president of basketball operations, as their new president of basketball operations. On May 20, after conducting interviews with several candidates, the Timberwolves announced that Ryan Saunders had been hired to a multi-year deal to become the team's permanent head coach, removing his "interim" status. With Rosas' hiring, the Timberwolves also made several front office changes in the organization. The Timberwolves held both a first- and second-round draft pick in the 2019 NBA draft. The 11th pick (which was Cameron Johnson) along with Dario Šarić was traded to the Suns in exchange for the 6th pick in Jarrett Culver, a small forward from Texas Tech. With the 43rd pick, the Timberwolves selected Jaylen Nowell, a point guard from Washington. They would also sign Naz Reid, an undrafted center from Louisiana State.

On February 6, 2020, The Timberwolves traded Andrew Wiggins to the Golden State Warriors for Karl-Anthony Towns' longtime friend D'Angelo Russell. At the season's end the Timberwolves got the 1st pick in the 2020 NBA draft. With that pick, the team drafted Anthony Edwards out of Georgia. In that same draft, they would trade up to select Jaden McDaniels with the 28th pick.

On February 21, 2021, head coach Ryan Saunders was fired, and Toronto Raptors assistant coach Chris Finch was hired to replace him. The Timberwolves finished the season 23-49 and missed the playoffs.

In April 2021, the Timberwolves announced that owner Glen Taylor had reached a deal with Marc Lore and Alex Rodriguez to sell the team. According to the deal, Lore and Rodriguez would become majority owners over the course of two years. On July 21, 2021, it was announced that Lore and Rodriguez had purchased 20% of the team. They went on to purchase 20% more in 2022 before the deal stalled in 2024. The transaction also includes ownership in the Timberwolves' WNBA sister-club, the Minnesota Lynx. The deal valued the team at $1.5 billion.

In the off-season the Wolves traded guard Ricky Rubio to the Cleveland Cavaliers for forward Taurean Prince. The Wolves then acquired guard Patrick Beverley in exchange for Juancho Hernangomez and former first round pick Jarrett Culver. The final move they made was signing former 2020 draft pick Leandro Bolmaro to a 4-year, 11.8-million-dollar rookie contract.

On September 22, 2021, after Gersson Rosas was relieved of his President of Basketball Operations duties, Sachin Gupta was promoted as the new interim president of basketball operations, while keeping his role as EVP of basketball operations. The Timberwolves finished the 2021–22 season with a 46–36 record, the second-most regular season wins since making the conference finals in 2004. Despite All-Star Karl-Anthony Towns fouling out with 11 points in 24 minutes, the Wolves beat the Los Angeles Clippers in the play-in game to secure their spot in the 2022 NBA playoffs. The Timberwolves were eliminated by the Memphis Grizzlies in the first round in six games.

On May 23, 2022, it was announced that the Timberwolves had hired Tim Connelly, who previously served as the Denver Nuggets' president of basketball operations, as their president of basketball operations, taking over Gupta's job. He was reportedly signed to a 5-year, $40 million contract by the Timberwolves, that includes ownership equity.

On July 1, 2022, the Timberwolves traded Malik Beasley, Patrick Beverley, Jarred Vanderbilt, Leandro Bolmaro, and 2022 22nd pick Walker Kessler and 4 future first round draft picks for 3x NBA DPOY Rudy Gobert from the Utah Jazz.

=== 2022–present: The Anthony Edwards era and new ownership ===
==== 2022–23: Rise of Anthony Edwards and arrival of Rudy Gobert ====
The Timberwolves began the 2022–23 season with high expectations following the Gobert trade. They were dealt a blow on November 28, 2022, when Karl-Anthony Towns suffered a severe calf strain that cost him 52 games. The injury pushed Anthony Edwards into a leadership role, with the first-time All-Star guiding the team to a 42–40 finish and a play-in tournament berth. After falling to the Los Angeles Lakers in the first game, the Timberwolves secured the 8th seed with a 25-point win over the Oklahoma City Thunder. They went on to lose to the first seed (and eventual NBA champion), the Denver Nuggets, in the first round in five games.

==== 2023–24: Second conference finals appearance ====
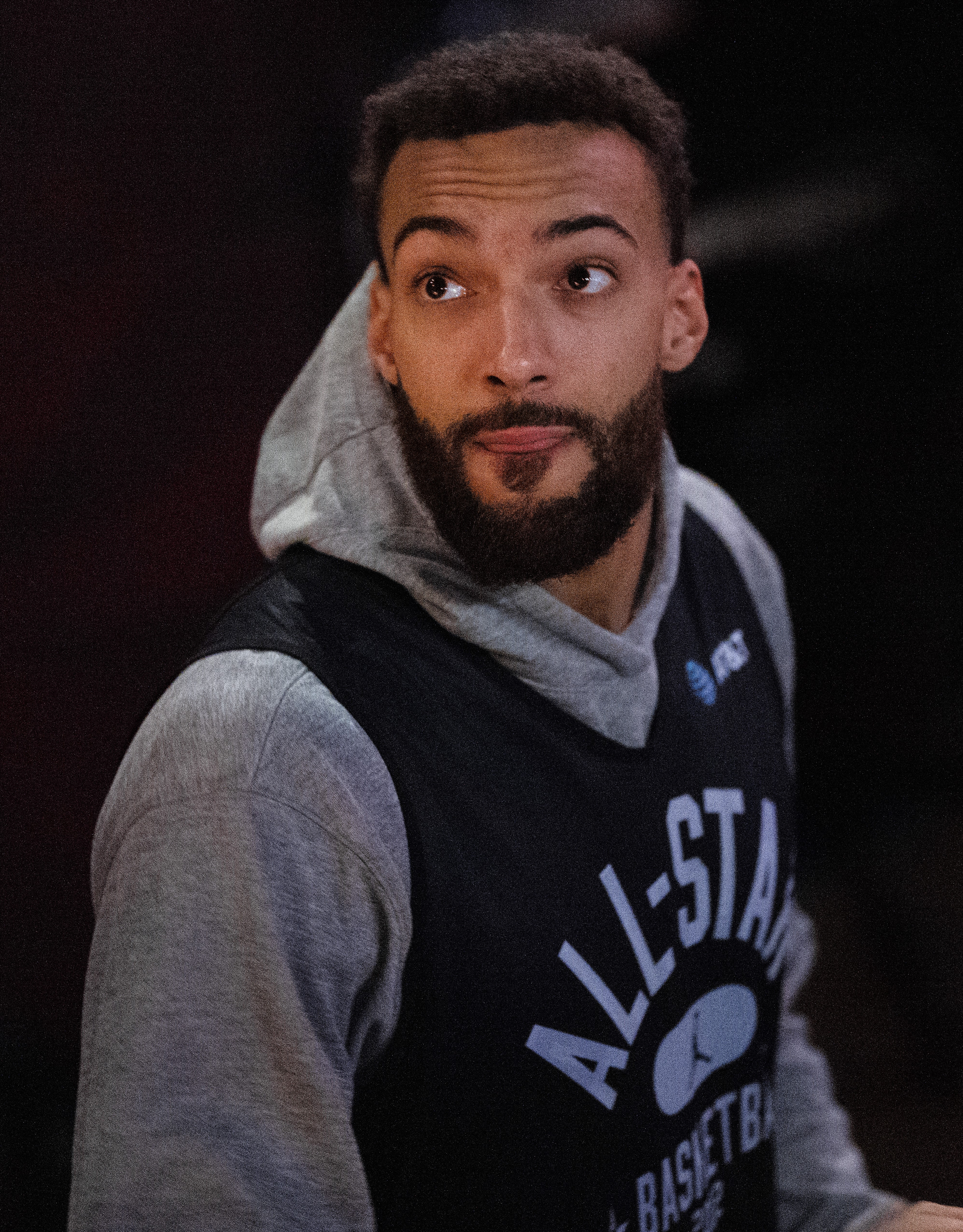
Rudy Gobert won a record-tying fourth DPOY in 2024

The 2023–24 season was their best since 2004, as they recorded 56 wins and landed the third seed in the Western Conference. They were the no. 1 defense in the league, anchored by eventual DPOY winner Rudy Gobert and All-Defensive selection Jaden McDaniels. Anthony Edwards made his first All-NBA Team, Karl-Anthony Towns made his fourth All-Star Appearance, and fan favorite Naz Reid was named Sixth Man of the Year.

On March 28, 2024, Glen Taylor announced that the sale of the team to prospective owners Marc Lore and Alex Rodriguez was off. Lore and Rodriguez were expected to make their third and final payment installment to Taylor on March 27, 2024, raising their ownership interest from 40% to 80% in both the Timberwolves and Lynx, stemming from the April 2021 agreement to purchase the team. However, Lore and Rodriguez's payment was not made by the deadline. It is unclear what exactly transpired leading to the deal falling through. On March 20, 2024, it was reported the Lore and Rodriguez lost the financial backing of the Carlyle Group that had previously pledged $300 million towards the final installment. On March 21, 2024, it appeared as if Lore and Rodriguez had secured the backing of Blue Owl Capital to keep the sale on track. Lore and Rodriguez state they filed the necessary paperwork for league approval prior to the March 27, 2024, payment deadline, which should have granted them a ninety-day extension to submit the funds to Taylor. The parties met to mediate the dispute on May 1, 2024, but no agreement was reached. On June 6, 2024, it was announced that Michael Bloomberg would join Rodriguez and Lore's ownership group.

In the first round of the 2024 playoffs, the Timberwolves swept the Phoenix Suns 4–0. It was their first series win since 2004, and the first series sweep in Minnesota men's professional sports history. The series saw Anthony Edwards ascend into rarefied air, becoming the 2nd player under 22 to record a 30/5/5 statline in multiple playoff games. His performance spurred widespread comparisons to a young Michael Jordan, even from Jordan himself.

In the conference semifinals, the Timberwolves squared off with the Denver Nuggets in a highly anticipated rematch of their 2023 first round series. After a nailbiter Game 1, the teams spent the next five games trading blowouts, leaving things 3–3 heading back to Denver for Game 7. Down 15 points at half, the Timberwolves led a miraculous comeback, winning the game 98–90 and securing a spot in the Western Conference finals — 20 years to the day of their last conference finals appearance. Their run ended when they lost to the Dallas Mavericks in five games.

In the 2024 NBA draft, the Timberwolves acquired the rights to Kentucky guard Rob Dillingham, the 8th overall pick, from the San Antonio Spurs in exchange for a 2031 unprotected first-round pick and a 2030 first-round pick swap (top-1 protected). They also selected Terrence Shannon Jr., a guard from the University of Illinois, with the 27th overall pick.

==== 2024–2026: Julius Randle and Donte Divincenzo/Karl-Anthony Towns trade ====
During the 2024 off-season, the Timberwolves traded All-Star Karl-Anthony Towns to the New York Knicks for fellow big man All-Star Julius Randle, sharpshooter Donte DiVincenzo and a first round pick.

In February 2025, Marc Lore and Alex Rodriguez announced that they had won the arbitration case with Glen Taylor regarding the ownership transfer of the Timberwolves and WNBA's Lynx, stemming from their original 2021 agreement to acquire the franchises. The arbitration ruling validated Lore and Rodriguez's claim that they had submitted the necessary paperwork for an extension prior to their March 2024 payment deadline. On April 2, 2025, Glen Taylor publicly announced that he would not appeal the arbitration decision, officially clearing the path for Lore and Rodriguez to assume full control of the organization, pending final NBA Board of Governors approval.

Amidst the transition in ownership, the Timberwolves also made significant roster moves to solidify their core. On October 23, 2024, the team reached a three-year, $110 million contract extension with reigning Defensive Player of the Year Rudy Gobert. The extension ensured that the Timberwolves retained the anchor of their league-leading defense and one of the most decorated defensive big men in NBA history, who had just won his record-tying fourth Defensive Player of the Year award. Gobert's presence, alongside rising superstar Anthony Edwards, All-Defensive forward Jaden McDaniels, and Sixth Man of the Year Naz Reid, underscored Minnesota’s commitment to competing at the highest level in the Western Conference for years to come.

The 2024–25 season began with the Timberwolves adjusting to their new roster. Julius Randle averaged 18.9 points, 7.2 rebounds, and 4.5 assists across his first 48 games, adding a physical presence and playmaking ability alongside Edwards and Gobert. However, the team faced a rocky stretch in November, including a four-game losing streak that led Edwards to publicly express frustration with the team’s communication and chemistry.

In late January 2025, Randle suffered a right adductor strain during a game against the Utah Jazz, sidelining him for at least two weeks. Upon his return, the Timberwolves regained momentum, including a dramatic 140–139 double-overtime win over the Denver Nuggets on April 1. On January 25, Edwards became the franchise's all-time leader in made three-pointers during a 133–104 win over the Nuggets. He surpassed Karl-Anthony Towns by hitting his 976th career three-pointer, finishing the game with 34 points on 14-of-23 shooting, including three made threes.

The Timberwolves finished the season with a 49–33 record, good for sixth place in the Western Conference and pitting them against the third-seeded Los Angeles Lakers in the first round of the playoffs. The Timberwolves defeated the Lakers in five games to advance to the conference semifinals in back-to-back years for the first time in franchise history. They then defeated the Golden State Warriors 4–1, earning them a trip to their second consecutive Western Conference Finals—where they would lose 4–1 to the top-seeded and eventual champion Oklahoma City Thunder.

The 2025–26 season again saw the Timberwolves finish as the sixth seed with a 49–33 record. Drawn against the rival Denver Nuggets in the first round, the team overcame injuries to Edwards and Donte DiVincenzo to complete a six-game series upset. Their run ended in the Western Conference semifinals, where they fell to the San Antonio Spurs 4–2.

==== 2026–present: LaMelo Ball's arrival/Julius Randle departure ====
On July 10, 2026, the Timberwolves traded for point guard LaMelo Ball alongside Josh Green in exchange for Naz Reid and Mouhamadou Gueye both of them moving to Charlotte; while Julius Randle was also traded to the Brooklyn Nets as part of a four-team trade.

== Logos and uniforms ==
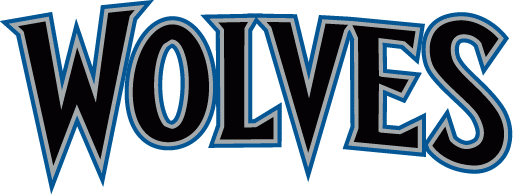
The Minnesota Timberwolves' wordmark logo used from 2008 to 2017.

In their inaugural season in 1989, the Timberwolves (or "Wolves" as it said on their jerseys) debuted blue road uniforms with green lettering and numbers with white. Their home uniforms featured blue lettering and numbers with green outlining. The creation of both uniforms was led by head designer, Brian Mulligan. There was going to be a green alternate jersey with blue lettering to go with the uniforms, but the idea was dropped. It would've followed a similar move the Dallas Mavericks took when they switched back to blue in the early 1990s, opting the Wolves a chance to use green for a jersey color instead. The Timberwolves would resurrect the blue uniforms from this era during the 2009–10 season, as part of the franchise's 20th anniversary.

After drafting Kevin Garnett, the Timberwolves design team, under guidance from Brian Mulligan, changed their uniforms in 1996. This time, the team added black and gray to the mix, and changing to a darker shade of blue. The front of the jerseys then said the team's full name "Timberwolves" in a different font. For the 1997–98 season, a black alternate uniform was introduced. Those uniforms were used until the 2007–08 season. The Timberwolves unveiled a new alternate logo on June 25, 2008.

The uniforms changed again in the 2008 off-season, this time with the road jerseys reading "Minnesota" and the home jerseys reading "Wolves", similar to that of the team's early years. Both uniforms had green, black, gray and blue on the pits and sides of the shorts. The Timberwolves unveiled modified uniforms on August 16, 2010. The new uniforms eliminated the green from the collar, jersey and shorts, and the team also adjusted its number font again. On November 23, 2010, the Timberwolves unveiled a black alternate uniform. On November 27, 2013, the team changed their black road alternate jersey to a short sleeved jersey. The change came about due to the NBA's introduction of sleeved jerseys.

On April 11, 2017, the team unveiled a new logo to coincide with the massive roster turnaround of the past few years. The Timberwolves revealed four new uniforms for the 2017–18 season as a part of a Nike-sponsored, league-wide initiative to redesign team uniforms. All four uniforms used "Wolves" for the team name and included the Nike Swoosh and Fitbit logos. The Association Edition uniform, revealed on August 10, 2017, consisted of a white uniform with navy and blue stripes and lettering. The Icon Edition uniform, which was revealed alongside its Association counterpart, has a navy body with white stripes and lettering. On September 15, the Timberwolves revealed their Statement Edition uniform which is primarily neon green with navy stripes, navy lettering for the team and player names, and white text with a navy stroke for the jersey numbers. The City Edition uniform, which is primarily gray with white lettering, was the last to be revealed on December 27.

On August 30, 2018, the Timberwolves unveiled their first "Classic" edition uniforms based on the black alternates used from 1997 to 2008. They also unveiled a dark purple "City" uniform inspired by Prince's 1984 album Purple Rain, as well as a white "Earned" version that was exclusive only to the 16 teams that made the 2018 playoffs. The Prince-inspired "City" uniform was brought back in the 2025–26 season.

The Timberwolves' 2019–20 "City" uniform, which was unveiled on November 20, 2019, featured a sky blue base with white letters and trim that paid homage to the waters of the Mississippi River and the Minneapolis–Saint Paul metropolitan area (the "Twin Cities").

For the 2020–21 season, the Timberwolves' "City" uniform paid homage to the North Star, featuring a midnight black base and aurora green trim. A green star is affixed below the neckline and above the abbreviation "MINN" in gray.

As part of the NBA's 75th anniversary, the Timberwolves' "City" uniform in the 2021–22 season mixed various elements from the franchise's previous uniforms. The royal blue base recalled the original 1989–1996 uniforms. The tree accents and lettering visually honored the 1996–2008 uniforms. The dark blue accents were inspired by the 2017–18 "City" uniforms. The original 1989–1996 logo was placed on the right leg, while the current logo was affixed on the left leg.

Beginning with the 2022–23 season, the Timberwolves unveiled a new "Statement" uniform, relegating neon green to trim color and featured a dark gray base. The full name "Timberwolves" was featured in front along with green-trimmed gray numbers. Also during the season, a new "City" uniform was unveiled, featuring a white base, black letters and stripes, and rainbow palette to represent Minnesota's colorful community.

The "City" uniform in the 2023–24 season featured a mostly blue base with white lake water gradients; the design represented the fun summertime activities of Minnesota's citizens, from camping to fishing and swimming. A special alternate court for the 2023 NBA in-season tournament was also unveiled to go with this uniform, featuring a light blue base with a lakewater blue strip in the middle. Also for the season, the Timberwolves brought back the original 1989–1996 white uniform for its "Classic" edition, this to celebrate the franchise's 35th season. This was paired with a modernized version of the original court used at the Target Center.

The 2024–25 "City" uniform served as the inverse of last season's "City" uniform, this time with a mostly white base, ice blue gradients and black accents. The design was meant to capture Minnesota's winter landscape, with white and ice blue gradients representing the state's frozen lakes during winter.

The Timberwolves brought back the 1997–2008 black uniform as a "Classic" uniform. Unlike in 2018–19, the last time the team wore said uniform, it would be paired with an updated version of the maple parquet court the team used from 1996 to 2008.

Prior to the 2026–27 season, the Timberwolves unveiled new logos and uniforms that brought back elements of the designs worn during the Kevin Garnett era. The white "Association" and blue "Icon" uniforms were loosely based on the original 1989–1996 uniform set, while the black "Statement" uniform was largely influenced by the 1997–2008 "Black Trees" alternate uniform. The logo was also tweaked to the classic blue and green color scheme while also incorporating a tree motif.

== Mascot ==
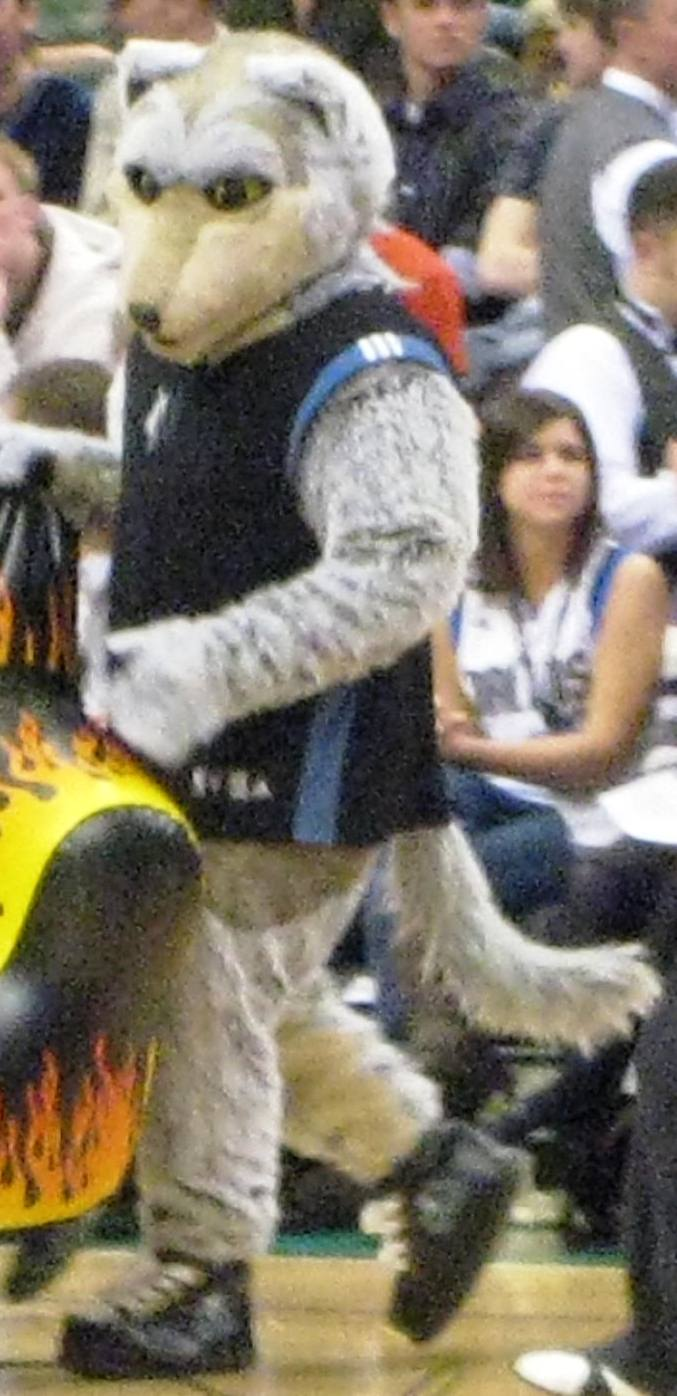
Crunch the Wolf

Crunch the Wolf is the official mascot of the Minnesota Timberwolves, According to the team's official website, "Crunch was born in the northernmost part of Minnesota’s wilderness areas. Deep in the forest, he grew with a love for something never before seen by others in his pack. Crunch's love for the game of basketball puzzled his mother and father, for he seemed to pick up the game on his own. With a makeshift basket built of pine-cones and birch bark, Crunch began to refine his game when he was still just a young pup. He learned the rules and techniques that make the game of basketball so great. He studied players and coaches alike, and soon would find himself on a journey like no other. Years later, when Minnesota’s expansion team, the Timberwolves, came to town, Crunch said goodbye to all he had known growing up in the woods, and migrated south to the Twin Cities where the team was to be based. No one is quite sure where Crunch lives, but legend has it he has a den somewhere deep inside the Target Center. He is lured out on game-days by the deafening howl made by Wolves fans. This howl creates an atmosphere in the Target Center that reminds Crunch of his days back in the forest, and yet keeps him here in Minneapolis, with the pursuit of helping the team to a victory."

== Arenas ==
Arenas
Arena	Tenure
Hubert H. Humphrey Metrodome	1989–1990
Target Center	1990–present

== Season-by-season record ==
List of the last five seasons completed by the Timberwolves. For the full season-by-season history, see List of Minnesota Timberwolves seasons.

Note: GP = Games played, W = Wins, L = Losses, W–L% = Winning percentage

Season	GP	W	L	W–L%	Finish	Playoffs
2021–22	82	46	36	.561	3rd, Northwest	Lost in first round, 2–4 (Grizzlies)
2022–23	82	42	40	.512	2nd, Northwest	Lost in first round, 1–4 (Nuggets)
2023–24	82	56	26	.683	3rd, Northwest	Lost in conference finals, 1–4 (Mavericks)
2024–25	82	49	33	.598	3rd, Northwest	Lost in conference finals, 1–4 (Thunder)
2025–26	82	49	33	.598	3rd, Northwest	Lost in conference semifinals, 2–4 (Spurs)

== Personnel ==
=== Current roster ===
Minnesota Timberwolves roster
Players

Pos.	No.	Player	Height	Weight	DOB	From
G	1	LaMelo Ball	6 ft 7 in (2.01 m)	180 lb (82 kg)	2001-08-22	SPIRE Academy (OH)
F	19	Joan Beringer	7 ft 0 in (2.13 m)	230 lb (104 kg)	2006-11-11	France
C	12	Johni Broome (TW)	6 ft 9 in (2.06 m)	244 lb (111 kg)	2002-07-19	Auburn
G	7	Jaylen Clark (injured)	6 ft 5 in (1.96 m)	205 lb (93 kg)	2001-10-13	UCLA
G	0	Donte DiVincenzo (injured)	6 ft 4 in (1.93 m)	203 lb (92 kg)	1997-01-31	Villanova
G	13	Ayo Dosunmu	6 ft 4 in (1.93 m)	201 lb (91 kg)	2000-01-17	Illinois
G	5	Anthony Edwards (injured)	6 ft 4 in (1.93 m)	225 lb (102 kg)	2001-08-05	Georgia
F	33	Isaiah Evans	6 ft 6 in (1.98 m)	175 lb (79 kg)	2005-12-06	Duke
C	27	Rudy Gobert	7 ft 1 in (2.16 m)	258 lb (117 kg)	1992-06-26	France
G	8	Bones Hyland	6 ft 2 in (1.88 m)	169 lb (77 kg)	2000-09-14	VCU
F	24	Jonathan Kuminga	6 ft 7 in (2.01 m)	225 lb (102 kg)	2002-10-06	The Patrick School (NJ)
F	41	Trey Lyles	6 ft 9 in (2.06 m)	234 lb (106 kg)	1995-11-05	Kentucky
F	3	Jaden McDaniels	6 ft 9 in (2.06 m)	185 lb (84 kg)	2000-09-29	Washington
G	15	Zyon Pullin (TW)	6 ft 4 in (1.93 m)	206 lb (93 kg)	2001-03-03	Florida
G/F	4	Terrence Shannon Jr.	6 ft 6 in (1.98 m)	215 lb (98 kg)	2000-07-30	Illinois
F	9	Cody Williams	6 ft 7 in (2.01 m)	190 lb (86 kg)	2004-11-20	Colorado
C	44	Rocco Zikarsky (TW)	7 ft 3 in (2.21 m)	227 lb (103 kg)	2006-07-11	Australia

Coaches
Head coach
- Chris Finch
Assistant(s)
- Nathan Bubes
- Joey Dorsey
- Moses Ehambe
- Kevin Hanson
- Chris Hines
- Max Lefevre
- Jeff Newton
- Pablo Prigioni
- Elston Turner

Legend
- (DP) Unsigned draft pick
- (FA) Free agent
- (S) Suspended
- (GL) On assignment to G League affiliate
- (TW) Two-way affiliate player
- Injured

Roster
Updated: November 5, 2026

=== Retained draft rights ===
The Timberwolves hold the draft rights to the following unsigned draft picks who have been playing outside the NBA. A drafted player, either an international draftee or a college draftee who is not signed by the team that drafted him, is allowed to sign with any non-NBA teams. In this case, the team retains the player's draft rights in the NBA until one year after the player's contract with the non-NBA team ends. This list includes draft rights that were acquired from trades with other teams.

Draft	Round	Pick	Player	Pos.	Nationality	Current team	Note(s)	Ref

=== Retired numbers ===
Minnesota Timberwolves retired numbers
No.	Player	Position	Tenure	Date
2	Malik Sealy	F	1998–2000^{1}	November 4, 2000
FLIP	Flip Saunders	Coach	1995–2005; 2014–2015^{2}	February 15, 2018

- ^{1} The Timberwolves retired Malik Sealy's number after he was killed by a drunk driver in an automobile accident after the 1999–2000 season concluded.
- ^{2} The Timberwolves retired "FLIP" in honor of Flip Saunders on February 15, 2018, who died from Hodgkin's lymphoma on October 25, 2015.
- The NBA retired Bill Russell's No. 6 for all its member teams on August 11, 2022.
- The Timberwolves will retire Kevin Garnett's No. 21 jersey after a game against the Boston Celtics on February 28, 2027.

=== Basketball Hall of Famers ===
Minnesota Timberwolves Hall of Famers
Players
No.	Name	Position	Tenure	Inducted
21	Kevin Garnett	F/C	1995–2007; 2015–2016	2020
4	Chauncey Billups	G	2000–2002	2024
Coaches
Name		Position	Tenure	Inducted
Rick Adelman		Head coach	2011–2014	2021

== Broadcasters ==
=== Radio ===
As of 2023, the Minnesota Timberwolves air all of their games on the iHeartRadio app, with select games airing on KFXN-FM 100.3 FM within the Twin Cities. WCCO had been the team's radio home from 2011 until the end of the 2022–23 season. Before that, KFAN/KFXN had been the Timberwolves' Twin Cities flagship station since the team's inception, except for a brief two-year hiatus to KLCI BOB 106.1 FM for the 2006–07 and 2007–08 seasons. Alan Horton has been the team's radio play-by-play announcer since the 2007–08 season.

=== Television ===
On July 30, 2026, the Timberwolves announced that they would stream their regional broadcasts on DAZN, with fifteen games to stream freely on the platform and the rest offered as a direct-to-consumer streaming package, in effect forgoing traditional cable and satellite television broadcasts.

Prior to 2026, the Timberwolves' games were broadcast primarily on FanDuel Sports Network North. But if the Minnesota Twins and Minnesota Wild occupy both FanDuel Sports Network North and FanDuel Sports Network North Extra, the game will be aired on WUCW as FanDuel Sports North Extra on The CW Twin Cities, and the Bally Sports app for viewers outside of WUCW's coverage area. The broadcasters are Michael Grady and Jim Petersen.
