= Glen Taylor =

American businessman and politician (born 1941)

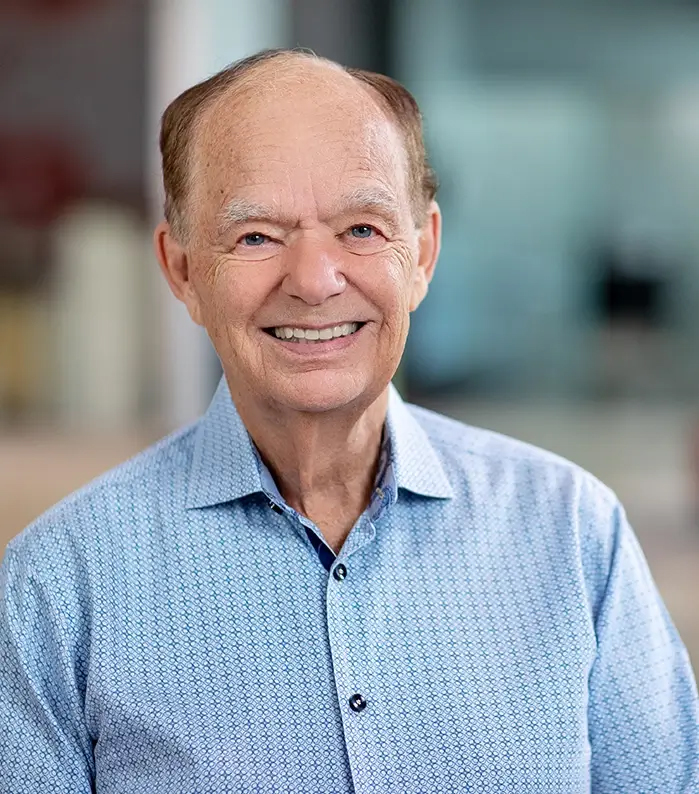
- Taylor in 2022

Minority Leader of the Minnesota Senate
- In office January 9, 1985 – January 5, 1987
- Preceded by: James E. Ulland
- Succeeded by: Duane Benson

Member of the Minnesota Senate
- In office January 6, 1981 – February 3, 1990
- Preceded by: Arnulf Ueland
- Succeeded by: Mark Piepho
- Constituency: 24th district (1983–1990); 29th district (1981–1983)

Personal details
- Born: April 20, 1941 (age 85) Springfield, Minnesota, U.S.
- Party: Republican
- Spouses: Glenda Taylor (m. 1957; div. 1990); Becky Mulvihill (m. 2007)
- Children: 6
- Education: Minnesota State University, Mankato (BS); Harvard University (MBA)

Glen Albert Taylor (born April 20, 1941) is an American billionaire business magnate and former politician from Minnesota. Taylor made his fortune as the founder and owner of Minnesota-based Taylor Corporation, one of North America's largest graphic communication companies.

Taylor was the owner of the Minnesota Timberwolves of the National Basketball Association from 1994 to 2025. He owned the Minnesota Lynx of the Women's National Basketball Association from 1999 to 2025. He is currently a part owner of Minnesota United FC of Major League Soccer. In addition to his sports team ownership, Taylor has owned the Star Tribune, Minnesota's largest newspaper, since 2014.

Taylor served in the Minnesota Senate as a Republican from 1981 to 1990. He planned to run for governor of Minnesota in 1990, but ultimately chose not to due to problems in his marriage. He remains a large donor to Republican candidates.

Ranked as the richest person in Minnesota, Taylor is listed on the Forbes 400 and his company ranks on Forbes's list of America's largest private companies. As of May 2025, Forbes reported his net worth to be US$2.9 billion.

== Early life and education ==
Taylor was born in Springfield, Minnesota, and grew up on a farm in Comfrey, Minnesota. He graduated from Comfrey High School in 1959, and after the owner of the farm he worked on insisted he use his potential in college, he received a Bachelor of Science in mathematics, physics and social studies from Minnesota State University, Mankato in 1962. In 1978 he received an executive MBA from Harvard Business School.

== Career ==
During and after college, Taylor worked at Carlson Wedding Service (later Carlson Craft), a Mankato print shop specializing in formal invitations. In 1975, company owner Bill Carlson wanted to retire, and Taylor offered to pay $2 million over 12 years for the company. The purchase (which he paid off early) formed the basis for the Taylor Corporation, a privately held multinational printing company with nearly 10,000 employees based in North Mankato, Minnesota. Taylor continues to be chairman of the board.

=== Politics ===
Taylor was a Republican Minnesota state senator from 1981 to 1990, serving as assistant minority leader from 1983 to 1985 and minority leader from 1985 to 1988. He considered himself a member of the party's moderate wing. He resigned in 1990, citing his need to focus more on his business interests.

Taylor strongly considered running for governor of Minnesota in 1990, but decided against it due to his divorce. Still an active member of the Republican Party, from 2016 to 2020 he donated $119,100 to its candidates and causes.

=== Sports team ownership ===
Taylor purchased majority ownership of the Minnesota Timberwolves of the National Basketball Association in 1994 for a reported $94 million and purchased the Minnesota Lynx of the Women's National Basketball Association in 1999. The Lynx have won four WNBA titles, while the Wolves have failed to reach even one NBA Finals under his ownership, which includes a 14-season playoff drought from 2004 to 2018.

In 2000, Taylor received a nine-month suspension after signing Joe Smith to a secret contract in violation of the league's salary cap rules. Before Donald Sterling's 2014 suspension, Taylor was the only NBA owner to be suspended for more than a couple of games.

In 2017, Taylor purchased the Iowa Energy of the NBA Development League (later called NBA G League) and renamed the team the Iowa Wolves as the developmental affiliate of the Timberwolves.

He is a past chairman of the NBA board of governors, serving two terms from 2008 to 2012 and from 2014 to 2017.

In 2021, Taylor entered into an agreement allowing Marc Lore, founder of the food-delivery company Wonder Group and Jet.com, an e-commerce business, and Alex Rodriguez, a former professional baseball player, to acquire the Timberwolves and the Lynx for an estimated $1.5 billion. Upon consummation of the current option stage, Taylor would retain a 20% stake in the teams.

Taylor is also a part owner of the Minnesota United FC soccer team.

=== Newspaper ownership ===
In 2014, Taylor bought the Star Tribune for about $100 million. He told MinnPost that the Star Tribune would be decidedly less liberal under his watch, but said the paper had already been shifting more to the center in recent years.

Minnesota Senate
Preceded by James E. Ulland	Minority Leader of the Minnesota Senate; 1985–1987	Succeeded by Duane Benson
Sporting positions
Preceded by Harvey Ratner; Marv Wolfenson	Principal Owner of the Minnesota Timberwolves; 1994–2025	Succeeded by Marc Lore; Alex Rodriguez
New creation	Principal Owner of the Minnesota Lynx; 1999–2025	Succeeded by Marc Lore; Alex Rodriguez
