= Telosa =

Planned city megaproject in the United States

Telosa City
- Artist's concept

- logo
- Country: United States of America
- Project announced: September 2021; 5 years ago

Area
  - Total: 240 sq mi (610 km^{2})

Population
  - Total: 5,000,000 (proposed)
  - Density: 21,000/sq mi (8,200/km^{2})
- Website: cityoftelosa.com

Telosa is a proposed utopian planned American city conceived by American billionaire Marc Lore and announced in 2021. The project has a target population of 5 million people by 2050, with the first phase of construction expected to house 50,000. The location has not been chosen yet, with the project's planners intending the city to be built on cheap land in Appalachia or the American West desert.

The name Telosa is derived from the Ancient Greek word telos, in this case meaning "purpose".

== Planning ==
Telosa was conceived by former Walmart U.S. eCommerce president and billionaire Marc Lore. In a statement announcing his resignation from Walmart, Lore expressed his desire to construct a "city of the future" based on a "reformed version of capitalism". Lore refers to his design philosophy for the city as "equitism", described as "a new model for society, where wealth is created in a fair way... It's not burdening the wealthy; it's not increasing taxes. It is simply giving back to the citizens and the people the wealth that they helped create".

Lore hired the architectural firm Bjarke Ingels Group, owned by Danish architect Bjarke Ingels, to handle the proposed city's master planning.

== Features ==
Telosa is planned to be a 15-minute city, with workplaces, schools, and basic goods and services being within a 15-minute commute from residents' homes. Vehicles that are powered by fossil fuels will not be permitted within the city, with an emphasis instead being placed upon walkability and the use of scooters, bicycles, and autonomous electric vehicles.

A massive skyscraper, dubbed "Equitism Tower", is conceived to serve as a "beacon for the city". The skyscraper's projected features include space for water storage, aeroponic farms, and a photovoltaic roof.

The proposed land ownership in the city is based on Georgist principles, as advocated by political economist Henry George in his 1879 book Progress and Poverty. Under the proposed rules, anyone would be licensed to build, keep or sell a home, building or any other structure, and residents would share ownership of the land under a community endowment.

== Possible locations ==
The project's planners intend the city to be built on inexpensive desert land in a location not yet decided as of 2021, with Utah, Idaho, Nevada, Arizona, Texas, and Appalachia proposed as potential locations.

== Reception ==
Writing in Timeout.com in September 2021, Ed Cunningham stated that "the blueprint designs are, depending on your taste, either dazzlingly utopian or unsettlingly dystopian. There's plenty of innovative architecture on display, alongside futuristic visions of public transport and spaces filled with greenery and nature". It has been criticized as being an unrealistic vanity project which would be less sustainable than building upon existing urban areas.

== See also ==
- Akon City
- Asgardia
- Bitcoin City
- Epcot
- Fordlândia
- Neom
- Próspera
