= Diapers.com =

Online retailer for baby products

- Screenshot
- Website type: Retailer
- Founded: 2005 in Montclair, New Jersey
- Dissolved: April 19, 2017; 9 years ago
- Area served: United States & 67 other countries
- Founders: Marc Lore and Vinit Bharara
- Key people: Emilie Arel Scott (CEO); Dave Lakshmanan (CTO); Randy Greben (CFO & GM); Jennifer Clarke (VP, HR); Mike Scelzo (VP, Customer Care); Cate Khan (VP, Merch & Buying); David Czehut (VP, Marketplace & Operations); Arlene Hong (General Counsel)
- Website: www.diapers.com

Diapers.com was an online specialty retailer for baby products from 2005 to 2017. It was founded by Marc Lore and Vinit Bharara in Montclair, New Jersey. Initially named 1800DIAPERS, the company set out delivering consumables, such as diapers, wipes, and formula. It used Kiva robots for warehouse automation and a combination of UPS Ground and FedEx delivery. In late 2008, Diapers.com expanded its selection of baby products, including clothes, car seats, strollers, and toys.

Diapers.com was ranked #35 overall, #1 for Retail, #3 in NY-NJ-PA, and #5 Top Indian Run Companies by Inc. magazine in 2009. The company's headquarters were located at Exchange Place in Jersey City, New Jersey.

Amazon.com acquired parent Diapers.com Quidsi, Inc. for $545 million on November 8, 2010. Prior to Amazon's purchase, Amazon sold diapers at steep losses in order to undercut Diapers.com and drive down the purchase price of the company.

In March 2017, Amazon.com announced the shutdown of Diapers.com and all other Quidsi sites as of April 19, 2017, due to lack of profitability. On April 20, 2017, Quidsi.com, Diapers.com, Soap.com, Wag.com, BeautyBar.com, Casa.com, and YoYo.com were relocated to Amazon.com, and were available at their former URLs. These URLs no longer work.

== History ==
Marc Lore and Vinit Bharara started Diapers.com in 2005. At launch, the company sold diapers, targeting mothers with children up to age 3. In its first year, the company sold $2.5 million in diapers and formula.

Lore and Bharara opened a formal office in Montclair, New Jersey, in 2006, and the following year hired their first full-time employee.

Originally created as 1800Diapers in 2005, the company later became Diapers.com and expanded to include Soap.com as well as other sites under the parent company Quidsi, Inc. Diapers, Inc. changed its name to Quidsi in 2009. Amazon.com acquired Quidsi, Inc. for $545 million on November 8, 2010. However, it continued to operate independently and follow an integration model similar to the one Amazon uses with Zappos.com until April 2017.

=== Acquisition by Amazon ===
Before their acquisition of Diapers.com, Amazon.com started a price war against them, which has been described as predatory pricing and enshittification tactics.
