= Marc Lore =

American entrepreneur (born 1971)

- Born: May 16, 1971 (age 55); Staten Island, New York, U.S.
- Education: Bucknell University (BA); University of Pennsylvania (dropped out)
- Occupation: Entrepreneur
- Known for: Walmart eCommerce CEO, GARP, Diapers.com and Jet.com, Co-owner of the Minnesota Timberwolves and Minnesota Lynx, Founder, Chairman, and CEO of the Wonder Group
- Spouse: Carolyn Lore (divorced)
- Children: 2

Marc Eric Lore (/ˈlɔːri/ LOR-ee; born May 16, 1971) is an American entrepreneur, businessman, and investor. Lore is founder, chairman, and CEO of the Wonder Group. From 2016 to 2021, he was the president and CEO of Walmart U.S. eCommerce. Lore was appointed in September 2016 to lead Walmart's e-commerce division when his company Jet.com—an e-commerce website launched in 2014—was acquired by Walmart, Inc. Walmart purchased Jet for $3.3 billion.

Prior to Jet, Lore was the CEO and co-founder of Quidsi, the parent company of a family of websites, including Diapers.com. Quidsi was sold in 2011 to Amazon for $545 million. Lore was named regional Entrepreneur of the Year by Ernst & Young in 2011, one of the "smartest people in technology" by Fortune, and dubbed the "LeBron James of e-commerce" by Matt Higgins.

Recode reported that Lore's next venture after stepping down from Walmart will be "a multi-decade project to build 'a city of the future' supported by 'a reformed version of capitalism'", announced in September 2021 as Telosa.

== Early life ==
Lore was born in the Staten Island borough of New York City, on May 16, 1971, the son of Peter and Chiara Lore. He is the oldest of three children and spent most of his childhood in Staten Island. When he was ten years old his family moved to the Lincroft section of Middletown Township, New Jersey.

His mother was a bodybuilder and personal trainer. During the late 1980s she trained model and actress Julianne Phillips who was Bruce Springsteen's wife at the time. Lore's father started a computer consulting company, Chadmarc Systems, named after his two sons.

In seventh grade, Lore got into stocks and began reading books on stock options and what would become known as derivatives – eventually leading him to start his career in finance. In high school he started a baseball card company called The Mint with his grade school friend, Lax Chandra.

== Education ==
From fifth until twelfth grade, Lore attended Ranney School in Tinton Falls, New Jersey. In 1989, during his senior year of high school, Lore became the New Jersey State Champ for the 55-meter dash. After graduating high school in 1989, Lore attended Bucknell University. He was on Bucknell's track and field team specializing in the 100-meter, 200-meter, long jump, and javelin events. In 1993 he received a Bachelor of Arts in business management and economics, graduating cum laude.

Lore also enrolled in The Wharton School at the University of Pennsylvania. He dropped out after one year in the MBA program to pursue Diapers.com.

== Career ==
=== Early career ===
After graduating college in 1993, Lore began his career at Bankers Trust in New York City. He held various investment banking positions, including vice president of emerging markets risk management at Credit Suisse First Boston and executive vice president of Sanwa International Bank in London, where he was head of the bank's risk management division.

In 1997, while at Credit Suisse First Boston, Lore and his colleague, Lev Borodovsky, started the Global Association of Risk Professionals (GARP) and founded the Financial Risk Manager (FRM) – a certification for financial risk managers. Today an estimated 50,000 people have earned the certification while GARP has over 150,000 members from 195 countries. Lore and Borodovsky also wrote The Professional's Handbook of Financial Risk Management.

=== The Pit ===
In 1999, Lore co-founded The Pit, Inc., an Internet market-making collectible company constructed as an alternative to eBay. Lore was CEO and The Pit was sold to the sports collectibles company, The Topps Company, Inc. for $5.7 million in 2001. Following the acquisition, Lore joined Topps as chief operating officer of gaming subsidiary WizKids.

=== Diapers.com ===
In 2005, Lore and Vinit Bharara founded 1800DIAPERS, later rebranded as Diapers.com. Lore was CEO. The company was sold to Amazon in 2011 for $545 million, and Lore then worked for Amazon for over two years.

=== Jet.com ===
In 2014, Lore founded the eCommerce company Jet with Nate Faust and Mike Hanrahan. Lore was CEO and in November 2014, Jet launched a campaign offering stock options to users, generating word-of-mouth for the company in advance of launch. In January 2015, Jet was featured in a cover story in Bloomberg Businessweek, in which it was revealed that Jet would be a shopping club in which members would pay an annual fee of $49.99 to access the lowest prices on millions of items; the membership fee was eliminated in October 2015.

In February 2015, Jet raised $140 million in pre-launch funding from investors including Bain Capital Ventures, Accel Partners, Alibaba Group, New Enterprise Associates, and others.

Beta testers in May 2015 reported cheaper prices than Amazon but longer delivery times. On July 21, 2015, Jet.com opened to the public.

On August 8, 2016, Walmart announced it had agreed to acquire Jet.com for $3.3 billion. Following the acquisition, Lore was appointed president and chief executive officer of Walmart U.S. eCommerce.

On May 19, 2020, Walmart announced that it was shutting down Jet, directing visitors to use Walmart.com instead.

=== Walmart ===
After its first full year with Lore as CEO, Walmart's U.S. eCommerce sales grew 44%.

According to Fool.com, "In the three full fiscal years since the Jet acquisition Walmart's eCommerce sales have nearly tripled, jumping 176%. The company has rapidly expanded grocery pickup and delivery and now has about 3,300 stores with grocery pickup and more than 1,850 stores offering grocery delivery, up from just a handful at the time of the Jet acquisition. Under the guidance of Lore, the company rolled out free two-day delivery for orders over $35 without a membership fee to compete with Amazon Prime, and that was accelerated to free one-day delivery last year, shortly after Amazon made the same move in Prime. In the most recent quarter, Walmart expanded ship-from-store capabilities to 2,500 stores, leveraging the power of its store base, and it launched Express Delivery, promising delivery in two hours."

In 2017, Walmart and Lore announced the launch of Store No. 8, a technology incubator based in the Silicon Valley. The initiative was named after an early Walmart store that founder, Sam Walton, used to try out new retail strategies. At the 2017 Shoptalk conference in Las Vegas, Lore said Store No. 8 will work with startups that specialize in areas that include robotics, virtual reality and augmented reality, machine learning, and artificial intelligence.

However, despite revenue growth, Walmart's e-commerce division incurred increasingly large losses: approximately $1.4 billion in 2018 and $1.7 billion in 2019.

=== Post-Walmart ===
After stepping down from Walmart, Recode reported that Lore's latest project will be "a multi-decade project to build 'a city of the future' supported by 'a reformed version of capitalism.'"

=== Investor ===
Lore is the lead investor in Archer Aviation, an electric vertical take-off and landing (eVTOL) company focused on "advancing the benefits of sustainable air mobility." In February 2021, Archer announced Lore would be investing an additional $10 million as the company announced their $1 billion purchase order from United Airlines and a SPAC.

On May 12, 2021 Alex Rodriguez and Lore announced a new venture capital firm called Vision Capital People or VCP. The company launched with $50 million of the pair's own money and could eventually raise $300 million to $500 million. Rodriguez and Lore plan to take early-stage stakes of 40% to 80% in their portfolio companies, much larger than the typical venture approach, a model that Lore said he found "frustrating" when he sought capital for his previous startups. Their first investment was NOW//with, a social commerce company.

On July 21, 2021, Lore, Rodriguez, and Dave Portnoy were named as investors of online brokerage firm, Tornado.

=== Minnesota Timberwolves and Minnesota Lynx ===
On April 10, 2021, Lore and Alex Rodriguez signed a letter of intent to purchase the Minnesota Timberwolves and Minnesota Lynx from Glen Taylor.

The deal became official on July 21, 2021, as the NBA approved Rodriguez and Lore's purchase of the Minnesota Timberwolves. The deal began with a minority share and was designed to incrementally transfer additional shares over three years until majority ownership was established. In 2024, Taylor claimed a delayed payment invalidated the deal. In 2025, an arbitration panel decided in favor of Lore and Rodriguez, and final transfer awaits approval by the NBA Board of Governors.

=== Telosa ===
In September 2021, Lore announced Telosa, a city he is building from scratch. The project has a target population of 5 million people by 2050, with the first phase of construction expected to house 50,000. The project's planners intend for the city to be built on desert land, with Utah, Idaho, Nevada, Arizona, Texas, and Appalachia proposed as potential locations. The name Telosa is derived from the Ancient Greek word telos, meaning "higher purpose".

Lore announced he had hired the architectural firm Bjarke Ingels Group (BIG) owned by Danish architect Bjarke Ingels.

The proposed land ownership in the city is inspired by Georgist principles, as advocated by political economist Henry George in his 1879 book Progress and Poverty. Under the proposed rules, anyone would be licensed to build, keep or sell a home, building or any other structure, but the city would retain ultimate ownership of the land.

=== Wonder ===
Lore founded Wonder Group, a food delivery startup, in 2018; he is the chairman and CEO. Wonder calls itself a "modern food court," with brick-and-mortar storefronts in Manhattan, Brooklyn, and multiple towns in New Jersey and Long Island, as well as an outlet in a Walmart in Pennsylvania. Customers can order from up to 30 different virtual restaurants, created with Wonder chef partners like Bobby Flay, Marcus Samuelsson, and Jose Andres, and restaurants like DC-based Maydan or Texas-based Tejas Chocolate and Barbecue, from a single Wonder location.

== Professional recognition ==
In 2019, actress and entrepreneur Gwyneth Paltrow called Lore a mentor and business coach, stating: "He's an e-commerce wizard and so he is probably the person I reach out to most for specific questions."

He was named regional Entrepreneur of the Year by Ernst & Young in 2011, one of the "smartest people in technology" by Fortune magazine, and in 2020 was dubbed "the LeBron James of e-commerce" by businessman Matt Higgins.

After Jet.com's acquisition in 2016, Lore made headlines as the highest-paid executive in America.

== Personal life ==
In 1996, Lore qualified for the U.S. National Bobsled Team but chose to stay with his banking job instead of training, thereby losing his seat on the national team for the 1998 Winter Olympics.

In March 2020, Lore publicly challenged a Hall of Fame football player, Jerry Rice, to the 40-yard dash as a part of Rich Eisen's Run Rich Run for St. Jude Children's Research Hospital. Lore beat Rice.

In September 2020, it was reported that Lore was working alongside Jennifer Lopez and Alex Rodriguez in a bid to buy the New York Mets. The deal did not go through.

In May 2021, Lore appeared alongside Ray Lewis on the NFL Network's coverage of the NFL draft as a part of Rich Eisen's Run Rich Run for St. Jude Children's Research Hospital. The event raised over $1.7M for charity, and Lore and Lewis were recognized as the fastest team. Lore's 40-yard dash clocked in at 4.97 seconds, just behind Michael Vick's time of 4.72 seconds.

Sporting positions
Preceded by Glen Taylor	Minnesota Timberwolves principal owner 2025–present Served alongside: Alex Rodriguez	Incumbent
Preceded by Glen Taylor	Minnesota Lynx principal owner 2025–present Served alongside: Alex Rodriguez	Incumbent
