= Accel (company) =

Venture capital firm

- Formerly: Accel Partners
- Type: Private
- Industry: Venture capital
- Founded: 1983; 43 years ago
- Headquarters: Palo Alto, California, U.S.
- Products: Venture capital Growth capital
- Number of employees: 300 (2024)
- Website: www.accel.com

Accel, formerly known as Accel Partners, is an American global venture capital firm. The company has offices in Palo Alto, California and San Francisco, California, with additional offices in London, and India. The company's most notable investment was a $12.7 million investment in Facebook in May 2005 for 10% of the company, before the company had revenue.

Accel invests in enterprise, SaaS, and consumer companies in seed, early, and growth-stage worldwide.

== History ==
In 1983, Accel was founded by Arthur Patterson and Jim Swartz. The co-founders developed the firm's "prepared mind" investment philosophy based on the Louis Pasteur quote "chance favors the prepared mind", which they say requires "deep focus" and a disciplined and informed approach to investing.

In 2000, Accel and Kohlberg Kravis Roberts formed Accel-KKR, an independently operated technology-focused private equity investment firm focused on control investments in middle-market companies. In the same year, Accel partnered with IDG Capital to create IDG-Accel, a joint venture focusing on early-stage and growth investments in the Chinese market.

In May 2005, Accel, under the leadership of Jim Breyer, invested $12.7 million for 10% of Facebook, before the company had revenue. This investment became one of the most lucrative in venture capital history and was worth $6.6 billion at the time of the company's initial public offering in 2012.

== Investments and fundraises ==
In December 2019, the company raised $550 million in its 6th investment fund focused on India.

In May 2024, Accel raised a $650 million fund to invest in early-stage companies across Europe and Israel, with a focus on artificial intelligence and computer security. Fundraising was facilitated, in part, by the establishment of Accel's London office in 2000.

In January 2025, Accel raised a $650 million early stage fund for startups in India and South East Asia. This was the firm's 8th fund focused on India.

Notable investments
Year	Companies
2020s	Bumble, Klaviyo, Linear, Synthesia, H Company, Vercel, Tailscale, Recurly, Laravel, Perplexity
2010s	1Password, Atlassian, CrowdStrike, Deliveroo, Docusign, Dropcam, Fiverr, Frame.io, Freshworks Jet.com, Lynda, Miro, Qualtrics, Scale AI, Spotify, Supercell, Squarespace, Swiggy, Tenable, UiPath, Venmo
2000s	Cloudera, Dropbox, Facebook, Flipkart (acquired by Walmart), Groupon, Slack, Kayak, Check24
1980s-1990s	MetroPCS, UUNet, Polycom, RealNetworks
