= David Coulter =

David Coulter may refer to:

- David Coulter (banker) (born 1949), director of Warburg Pincus
- David Coulter (politician), Democratic Party politician and county executive of Oakland County
- David Coulter (minister) (born 1957), Church of Scotland minister and RAF chaplain
- David Coulter (karateka) (born 1957), Scottish karateka

== See also ==
- Coulter (surname)
- Dave Coulier, American comedian
