= List of shipwrecks in April 1867 =

The list of shipwrecks in April 1867 includes ships sunk, foundered, grounded, or otherwise lost during April 1867.

== 1 April ==
List of shipwrecks: 1 April 1867
Ship	State	Description
Alabama	United States	The sidewheel paddle steamer was destroyed by fire at Grand View, Louisiana.
Berdich	United Kingdom	The ship was driven ashore in the Farne Islands, Northumberland. She was refloated.
Charlotte	United Kingdom	The schooner was driven ashore at Rhoscolyn, Anglesey. Her crew were rescued.
Delta	United Kingdom	The barque was destroyed by fire at Buenos Aires, Argentina.

== 2 April ==
List of shipwrecks: 2 April 1867
Ship	State	Description
Dasher	United Kingdom	The polacca was wrecked at Oxwich Point, Glamorgan. Her crew were rescued.
Fanny	Rostock	The schooner was wrecked near Skagen, Denmark with the loss of all hands.
Frithiof	Norway	The ship was driven ashore at Skagen. She was on a voyage from Mandal, Norway to a Baltic port.
Maid of Athens	United Kingdom	The brig was driven ashore and wrecked between the Kullen Lighthouse ad Helsingborg, Sweden. She was on a voyage from Blyth, Northumberland to Swinemünde, Prussia.
Robert	United Kingdom	The brig was driven ashore and wrecked at Johnshaven, Aberdeenshire. Her four crew were rescued by rocket apparatus.
Solace	United Kingdom	The barque foundered off Cape St. Vincent, Portugal. Her twelve crew were rescued by Scanderia (United Kingdom). She was on a voyage from Cartagena, Spain to Cardiff, Glamorgan.
South Australian	(United Kingdom of Great Britain and Ireland) South Australia	The steamer was wrecked on the coast of South Otago, New Zealand while en route from Port Chalmers to Melbourne. She hit rocks heavily, stoving in part of her hull, and she took on water rapidly. All hands were saved.
Superb	United Kingdom	The ship was run into by the brig Azoff (United Kingdom) and sank off Anholt, Denmark. Her crew were rescued by Azoff.
Thane of Fife	United Kingdom	The sloop sank near Berwick upon Tweed, Northumberland. Her crew were rescued.

== 3 April ==
List of shipwrecks: 3 April 1867
Ship	State	Description
Flirt	United States	The schooner was sunk by ice. She was on a voyage from New York to Harbour Grace, Nova Scotia, British North America.
Jane Evans	United Kingdom	The ship was wrecked at Thisted, Denmark. She was on a voyage from "Gioja" to Königsberg, Kingdom of Prussia.

== 4 April ==
List of shipwrecks: 4 April 1867
Ship	State	Description
Annie Rose	United Kingdom	The ship was driven ashore at St. Combs, Aberdeenshire.
Highland Brigade	United Kingdom	The barque was wrecked on the Haisborough Sands, Norfolk. Her crew survived. She was on a voyage from Grimsby, Lincolnshire to Alicante, Spain.
H. L. Richardson	United Kingdom	The ship ran aground in the Mississippi River. She was on a voyage from New Orleans, Louisiana, United States to Liverpool, Lancashire.
Therese	United Kingdom	The ship ran aground at Cuxhaven. She was refloated on 9 April.

== 5 April ==
List of shipwrecks: 5 April 1867
Ship	State	Description
Antoinette	United Kingdom	The ship ran aground in the Mississippi River. She was on a voyage from New Orleans, Louisiana, United States to Liverpool, Lancashire.
Augusta Louise	United States	The ship was run down and sunk off the Irish coast by the steamship Louisiana (United States). Her crew were rescued by Louisiana.
Friend	United Kingdom	The sloop was driven ashore at Beachy Head, Sussex. She was on a voyage from Portland, Dorset to London. She was refloated and assisted in to Dover, Kent for repairs.
Queen	(United Kingdom of Great Britain and Ireland) New Zealand	The steamer struck rocks and foundered near the Brothers Islands in Cook Strait while en route from Wellington to Nelson. The crew were rescued from a lifeboat near the entrance to Tory Channel by the steamer Adelaide. All hands were saved.
Shirllywick	United Kingdom	The schooner was driven ashore and wrecked at Kirkcudbright. Her crew were rescued. She was on a voyage from Carrickfergus, County Antrim to Maryport, Cumberland.
St. Catherine	United Kingdom	The ship foundered in the Atlantic Ocean. She was on a voyage from Sherbro Island, Sierra Leone to Liverpool.
Tantamar	United Kingdom	The ship was wrecked on Key Breton. Her crew were rescued. She was on a voyage from Jamaica to Cienfuegos, Cuba.

== 6 April ==
List of shipwrecks: 6 April 1867
Ship	State	Description
Aurora	United Kingdom	The ship was driven ashore and wrecked at "Hohenweg". She was on a voyage from Newcastle upon Tyne, Northumberland to Baden, Prussia.
Elizabeth	United Kingdom	The schooner ran aground at Burntisland, Fife. She was on a voyage from Burntisland to London. She floated off the next day and drove ashore. She was refloated and taken in to Burntisland in a leaky condition.

== 7 April ==
List of shipwrecks: 7 April 1867
Ship	State	Description
Andromache	United Kingdom	The barque was abandoned in the Atlantic Ocean 100 nautical miles (190 km) north north east of San Salvador. She was on a voyage from Cuba to London. Andromache ran aground on Great Cuana Cay, in the Abaco Islands on 20 April.
Stad Goor	Danzig	The ship was driven ashore and wrecked at Agger, Denmark. Her crew were rescued. she was on a voyage from Grimsby, Lincolnshire, United Kingdom to Danzig.

== 8 April ==
List of shipwrecks: 8 April 1867
Ship	State	Description
Carl Rudolph	Courland Governorate	The ship was driven ashore 2 nautical miles (3.7 km) from Libava. She was on a voyage from Dundee, Forfarshire, United Kingdom to Libava. She was refloated and towed in to Libava.
Emanuel	United Kingdom	The ship was run down and sunk by Esperance (Prussia) in the Dogger Bank. Her crew were rescued.
Helena	United Kingdom	The sloop sprang a leak and sank at Dundee. She was refloated.
Unnamed	Flag unknown	The brig was driven ashore and wrecked at Brielle, South Holland, Netherlands.

== 9 April ==
List of shipwrecks: 9 April 1867
Ship	State	Description
Crown	United Kingdom	The schooner was run into by the troopship HMS Jumna (Royal Navy) and sank at South Shields, County Durham. She was refloated but found to be severely damaged.
Lilla	United Kingdom	The ship capsized and sank in the Elbe. She was on a voyage from Hamburg to Dublin. She was refloated on 30 June and taken in to Hamburg in a wrecked condition.
William Shepherd	United Kingdom	The collier, a brig, was wrecked on the Knecht Sand, in the North Sea with the loss of all nine crew. She was on a voyage from Newcastle upon Tyne, Northumberland to Hamburg.

== 10 April ==
List of shipwrecks: 10 April 1867
Ship	State	Description
Flota	United Kingdom	The brig foundered off Orfordness, Suffolk. Her crew were rescued by a smack. She was on a voyage from South Shields, County Durham to Portsmouth, Hampshire.

== 11 April ==
List of shipwrecks: 11 April 1867
Ship	State	Description
Caleb Curtis	United States; United States	Pilot boat was wrecked inside the shipping Bonita Channel outside Golden Gate Bridge on April 11, 1867 attempting to cross the bar on her way to relieve the pilot boat J. C. Cousins.
Dronningen, and Spanker	Norway; United Kingdom	The ships collided off Dungeness, Kent and were both severely damaged. Dronningen was on a voyage from Kristiansand to Liverpool, Lancashire. She was taken in to Ramsgate, Kent.
Forganhall	United Kingdom	The ship foundered in the Irish Sea. She was on a voyage from Liverpool to Quebec City, Province of Canada, British North America.
Glide	United Kingdom	The schooner was driven ashore at Blackpool, Lancashire. Her five crew were rescued by the Blackpool Lifeboat. She was on a voyage from Killough, County Down to Liverpool.
H. L. Routh	United States	The schooner ran aground on the Salthouse Bank. Her fourteen crew were rescued by the Blackpool Lifeboat Robert William ( Royal National Lifeboat Institution). She was on a voyage from Liverpool to Glasgow, Renfrewshire, United Kingdom. She was refloated on 13 March with assistance from the Lytham Lifeboat Wakefield ( Royal National Lifeboat Institution).
Isis	United Kingdom	The ship was wrecked near "Chiltepic", Mexico. Her crew were rescued.
Mary	United Kingdom	The ship ran aground off the coast of Lincolnshire. Her crew were rescued by the Sutton Lifeboat Birmingham ( Royal National Lifeboat Institution). Mary was on a voyage from King's Lynn, Norfolk to Stockton-on-Tees, County Durham.
Mindello	Brazil	The barque was driven ashore at Crosby Point, Lancashire. She was on a voyage from Pernambuco to Liverpool.
Susan L. Campbell	United Kingdom	The barque was wrecked on the Salthouse Bank. Her fourteen crew were rescued by the Blackpool Lifeboat Robert William ( Royal National Lifeboat Institution). Susan L. Campbell was on a voyage from Liverpool to Saint John, New Brunswick, British North America.
Tiptree	United Kingdom	The full-rigged ship was wrecked on the Jordan Flats, in Liverpool Bay with the loss of three of her crew. Survivors were rescued by the Formby Lifeboat. She was on a voyage from Liverpool to Quebec City.
Vesper	United Kingdom	The steamship ran aground on the Fowler Rock, in the River Tay. She was on a voyage from Sunderland, County Durham to Dundee, Forfarshire. She was refloated the next day.
Wonder	(United Kingdom of Great Britain and Ireland) Jersey	The smack was driven against the pier at Fécamp, Seine-Inférieure and sank. Her crew were rescued.

== 12 April ==
List of shipwrecks: 12 April 1867
Ship	State	Description
Abram	United Kingdom	The ship foundered off Malta. She was on a voyage from Newcastle upon Tyne, Northumberland to Trieste.
Star of the Teign	United Kingdom	The ship was destroyed by fire in the Atlantic Ocean. Her crew were rescued by Satellite (United Kingdom). Star of the Teign was on a voyage from Liverpool, Lancashire to Guayaquil, Ecuador.
Suffolk Hero	United Kingdom	The schooner was wrecked on "Davillian Island". Her crew were rescued. She was on a voyage from the Clyde to Galway.
Zeno	United Kingdom	The ship collided with Trowbridge (United Kingdom) and was severely damaged. She was on a voyage from Sunderland, County Durham to Cartagena, Spain. She was taken in to Deal, Kent for repairs.

== 13 April ==
List of shipwrecks: 13 April 1867
Ship	State	Description
Annie Archbell	United Kingdom	The ship ran aground off Vlieland, Friesland, Netherlands with the loss of four of her eighteen crew.

== 14 April ==
List of shipwrecks: 14 April 1867
Ship	State	Description
Aurora	Denmark	The galiot struck the Horns Reef and sank with the loss of all hands. She was on a voyage from an English port to Ringkøbing.
Daniel Wood	United States	The whaler, a barque, was wrecked on the French Frigate Shoals, in the Pacific Ocean 450 nautical miles (830 km) off Honolulu, Hawaii. Her captain set off for Honolulu in a boat, leaving 27 crew on the shoal. They were rescued on 28 April by USS Lackawanna (United States Navy).
Ernstatningen	Norway	The ship was abandoned in the North Sea. Her crew were rescued by Harriet Agnes (United Kingdom). Ernstatningen was on a voyage from Norway to Honfleur, Manche, France.
Irwell	United Kingdom	The steamship was driven ashore near Rønne, Denmark. She was on a voyage from Hull, Yorkshire to Danzig. She had been refloated by 21 April and taken in to Rønne.
Secret Shot	United Kingdom	The brigantine capsized off Ness Point, Suffolk and sank on the Holm Sand. Her seven crew were rescued by the surf boat Salem (United Kingdom). Secret Shot was on a voyage from Southampton, Hampshire to Sunderland, County Durham.
T. D. Marshall	United Kingdom	The paddle tug collided with Mary (United Kingdom) at Blyth, Northumberland and was abandoned by her crew.

== 15 April ==
List of shipwrecks: 15 April 1867
Ship	State	Description
Delphin Elise	(flag) France	The ship was driven ashore at the Rammekens Castle, Vlissingen, Zeeland, Netherlands. She was on a voyage from Antwerp, Belgium to London, United Kingdom.
Duo	United Kingdom	The brig foundered 25 nautical miles (46 km) south of Laguna. Her crew were rescued.
Irwell	United Kingdom	The steamship ran aground on Bornholm, Denmark and was wrecked. She was on a voyage from Hull, Yorkshire to Danzig.
Marie	France	The ship sank off Le Croisic, Loire-Inférieure. She was on a voyage from Douarnenez, Finistère to an English port.
Mary Ann	United Kingdom	The brig was driven ashore on Læsø, Denmark. She was on a voyage from Newcastle upon Tyne, Northumberland to Gävle, Sweden. She was refloated and taken in to Gothenburg, Sweden in a leaky condition.
Nordnace, and Uncle Joe	Norway; United States	The ships collided at Vlissingen and were both severely damaged. Nordnace was on a voyage from Antwerp to Odesa, Russia. Uncle Joe was on a voyage from Antwerp to South Shields, County Durham, United Kingdom. Both vessels put back to Antwerp for repairs.
Wellington	United Kingdom	The brig was driven ashore at Swansea, Glamorgan. She was on a voyage from Swansea to Gibraltar. She was refloated and towed back to Swansea with assistance from a tug and the Swansea Lifeboat Wolverhampton ( Royal National Lifeboat Institution).

== 16 April ==
List of shipwrecks: 16 April 1867
Ship	State	Description
Onehunga	(United Kingdom of Great Britain and Ireland) New Zealand	The schooner went ashore and was wrecked near the mouth of the Fox River, New Zealand.
Uriel	United Kingdom	The ship was driven ashore near Helsingør, Denmark. She was on a voyage from Memel, Prussia to Cardiff, Glamorgan.
Vesper	United Kingdom	The brig was driven ashore 7 nautical miles (13 km) from Helsingør, Denmark. She was refloated on 21 April and towed in to Helsingør.
William Gowland	United Kingdom	The ship sprang a leak and sank in the River Thames at Charlton, Kent. She was refloated on 24 April.

== 17 April ==
List of shipwrecks: 17 April 1867
Ship	State	Description
Iona	(United Kingdom of Great Britain and Ireland) New Zealand	The cables of the schooners Iona and Cymraes became entangled in a heavy sea near Hokitika. The crew of the Cymraes managed to clear her in a damaged but reparable state, but the Iona was driven ashore and wrecked.

== 18 April ==
List of shipwrecks: 18 April 1867
Ship	State	Description
Egbert	United Kingdom	The barque was wrecked at Bembridge, Isle of Wight. Her crew were rescued.
Maggie	United Kingdom	The ship was driven ashore at Holyhead, Anglesey. She was on a voyage from Paraíba, Brazil to Liverpool, Lancashire.
Sinai	United Kingdom	The ship was wrecked on the Wolves, in the Bristol Channel off the coast of Glamorgan. Her crew were rescued. She was on a voyage from Wexford to Newport, Monmouthshire.

== 19 April ==
List of shipwrecks: 19 April 1867
Ship	State	Description
Berkshire	United Kingdom	The ship collided with the paddle steamer Scotia (United Kingdom) and was abandoned in the Atlantic Ocean (49°11′N 29°13′W). All on board were rescued by Scotia. Berkshire was on a voyage from New Orleans, Louisiana to Havre de Grâce, Seine-Inférieure.
Hamlin	United Kingdom	The ship ran aground off the Brisons, Cornwall and was wrecked. Her crew were rescued. She was on a voyage from Cardiff, Glamorgan to London.
Vollenhove	Kolberg	The ship was driven ashore and wrecked near Kolberg. She was on a voyage from Newcastle upon Tyne, Northumberland, United Kingdom to Kolberg.
William Tabor	United States	The steamship was driven ashore on the coast of Florida. She was on a voyage from New York to Galveston, Texas. She was later refloated and taken in to Key West, Florida.

== 20 April ==
List of shipwrecks: 20 April 1867
Ship	State	Description
Helen Finlayson	United Kingdom	The ship was driven ashore in the Scheldt. She was on a voyage from Antwerp, Belgium to an English port.
Retriever	United Kingdom	The barque ran aground on the Middelgrunden, in the Baltic Sea. She was on a voyage from West Hartlepool, County Durhamt o Stockholm, Sweden. She was refloated.

== 21 April ==
List of shipwrecks: 21 April 1867
Ship	State	Description
Adsey	United Kingdom	The ship ran aground on the Scroby Sands, Norfolk. She was on a voyage from Middlesbrough, Yorkshire to Milton Regis, Kent. She was refloated and towed in to Great Yarmouth, Norfolk in a leaky condition.
Catherine	United Kingdom	The schooner was wrecked on the Horse Bank, in the Irish Sea off the coast of Lancashire. Her crew were rescued. She was on a voyage from Preston to Fleetwood, Lancashire.
Dolphin	United Kingdom	The schooner foundered off the Newsand Lightship ( Trinity House) with the loss of all hands.
Hind	United Kingdom	The brig sprang a leak and foundered in the North Sea off Sea Palling, Norfolk with the loss of her captain.
Hope	United Kingdom	The ship was driven ashore at Padstow, Cornwall. She was on a voyage from Llanelly, Glamorgan to London. She was refloated on 23 April.
Nellie Townsend	United Kingdom	The barque foundered off the Tuskar Rock with the loss of a crew member. Survivors were rescued by the barque Lancaster (United Kingdom). Nellie Townsend was on a voyage from Liverpool, Lancashire to Buenos Aires, Argentina.
HMS Perseus	Royal Navy	The Camelion-class sloop ran aground on an uncharted reef east of Sebuyau, Netherlands East Indies. Subsequently refloated, repaired and returned to service.
Unnamed	Flag unknown	The brig ran aground and sank on the Haisborough Sands, in the North Sea off the coast of Norfolk with the loss of all hands.

== 22 April ==
List of shipwrecks: 22 April 1867
Ship	State	Description
Tronkiena Hellechina	Netherlands	The ship was driven ashore on Skagen, Denmark. She was on a voyage from Malmö, Sweden to the Meuse (Dutch: Maas).

== 23 April ==
List of shipwrecks: 23 April 1867
Ship	State	Description
Annandale	United Kingdom	The ship was driven ashore in Vineyard Sound. She was on a voyage from New York. United States to Saint John, New Brunswick, British North America.
W. H. Townsend	United Kingdom	The brig foundered in the Atlantic Ocean. Her crew were rescued. She was on a voyage from Cienfuegos, Cuba to New York.

== 24 April ==
List of shipwrecks: 24 April 1867
Ship	State	Description
Harriet Agnes	United Kingdom	The steamship ran aground on the Maplin Sand, in the North Sea off the coast of Essex. She was on a voyage from Gravesend, Kent to Copenhagen, Denmark. She was refloated and resumed her voyage.
Maria	United Kingdom	The ship was driven ashore at Kettleness, Yorkshire.
Princess	United Kingdom	The ship was driven ashore at Ostend, West Flanders, Belgium. She was refloated and taken in to Ostend in a severely leaky condition.
St. Vincent	United Kingdom	The ship caught fire. Her passengers were taken off by Delta (United Kingdom). St. Vincent put in to Plymouth, Devon. She was towed to the Cattewater and scuttled. She was on a voyage from Adelaide, South Australia to London.
Vigilant	United Kingdom	The paddle tug collided with a hopper ship and sank off South Shields, County Durham with the loss of her captain. Two survivors were rescued by the hopper ship.

== 25 April ==
List of shipwrecks: 25 April 1867
Ship	State	Description
Daring	United Kingdom	The smack sank at Ramsgate, Kent.
Mary Ann	United Kingdom	The schooner was driven ashore and wrecked at Holyhead, Anglesey. Her crew were rescued. She was on a voyage from Barrow-in-Furness, Lancashire to Briton Ferry, Glamorgan.
Nevada	United States	The ship ran aground on the Memory Rock, in the Bahamas. She was on a voyage from New Orleans, Louisiana to Liverpool, Lancashire. She was refloated on 2 May and taken in to Nassau, Bahamas.
Preston Belle	United Kingdom	The steamship was wrecked in Jack Sound.
Snaefell	(United Kingdom of Great Britain and Ireland) Isle of Man	The paddle steamer ran aground in the River Mersey. She was on a voyage from Liverpool, Lancashire to Douglas, Isle of Man. She was refloated and resumed her voyage.
Wulff	United Kingdom	The ship was driven ashore and wrecked on the Blackhill Rocks, on the coast of County Durham. Her crew were rescued. She was on a voyage from London to Newcastle upon Tyne, Northumberland.

== 26 April ==
List of shipwrecks: 26 April 1867
Ship	State	Description
Ann	United Kingdom	The ship was driven ashore near Campbeltown, Argyllshire.
Ashley	United Kingdom	The ship ran aground and sank in Broad Sound. Her crew survived. She was on a voyage from Ardglass, County Down to Newport, Monmouthshire.
Caroline	United Kingdom	The ship sprang a leak and foundered in the English Channel 5 nautical miles (9.3 km) off Dartmouth, Devon. Her crew rescued. She was on a voyage from Poole, Dorset to Runcorn, Cheshire.
Cupid, and Flora	(United Kingdom of Great Britain and Ireland) British North America; Denmark	The ship Cupid collided with the schooner Flora off Mallorca, Spain. Flora sank. Cupid was taken in tow by Aurora (United Kingdom) but foundered on 29 April 30 nautical miles (56 km) south of the "Poranerolles Lighthouse" with the loss of two of her crew. Survivors were rescued by Aurora.
Helen	(United Kingdom of Great Britain and Ireland) British North America	The barque ran aground on the Red Sand, in the Thames Estuary.
Welland	United Kingdom	The schooner was driven ashore at Whitby, Yorkshire. She was on a voyage from Whitby to Hartlepool, County Durham.

== 27 April ==
List of shipwrecks: 27 April 1867
Ship	State	Description
Fortuna	Prussia	The ship was run into by Ariel (United Kingdom) and sank at Swinemünde. Her crew were rescued. She was on a voyage from Rügenwalde to Stettin.

== 28 April ==
List of shipwrecks: 28 April 1867
Ship	State	Description
Pearl	(United Kingdom of Great Britain and Ireland) Isle of Man	The smack was driven ashore and severely damaged at Donaghadee, County Down. She was on a voyage from Galway to Cardiff, Glamorgan. She had been refloated by 4 May and taken in to Belfast, County Antrim for repairs.

== 29 April ==
List of shipwrecks: 29 April 1867
Ship	State	Description
Elizabeth Brown	United Kingdom	The schooner foundered in the North Sea 60 nautical miles (110 km) south east of Buchan Ness, Aberdeenshire. Her crew were rescued by Concordia (Hamburg). Elizabeth Brown was on a voyage from Blyth, Northumberland to Gothenburg, Sweden.

== 30 April ==
List of shipwrecks: 30 April 1867
Ship	State	Description
Clementine	Prussia	The brigantine was driven ashore at Tacumshane, County Wexford, United Kingdom. She was on a voyage from the Rio Grande to Liverpool Lancashire, United Kingdom.
Maggie	United Kingdom	The brigantine was wrecked near Carnsore, County Wexford. She was on a voyage from London to Dublin.

== Unknown date ==
List of shipwrecks: Unknown date in April 1867
Ship	State	Description
Abel Tasman	United Kingdom	The ship was wrecked in the Laccadive Islands before 12 April. Her crew were rescued. She was on a voyage from Bombay, India to Liverpool, Lancashire.
Admiral Cator	United Kingdom	The steamship was driven ashore in West Loch Tarbert.
Alice Grey	United Kingdom	The ship was abandoned before 20 April.
Aurora	Denmark	The galeas struck the Horns Reef and sank with the loss of all hands. She was on a voyage from an English port to Ringkøbing. The wreck came ashore at "Gravlup" on 14 April.
Candia	United Kingdom	The steamship ran aground in the Hooghly River. She was on a voyage from Suez, Egypt to Calcutta, India. She was refloated two days later and completed her voyage.
Conqueror	United Kingdom	The ship was wrecked on Fortune Island, Bahamas. She was on a voyage from St. Jago de Cuba, Cuba to Swansea, Glamorgan.
Eva	(United Kingdom of Great Britain and Ireland) British North America	The ship was abandoned in the Atlantic Ocean. She was on a voyage from Glasgow, Renfrewshire to Boston, Massachusetts, United States. She was subsequently discovered by the whaling barque Firmenza (Portugal) and taken in to Faial Island, Azores in a derelict condition.
Excellent	United Kingdom	The ship was wrecked. Her crew were rescued. She was on a voyage from Liverpool to Halifax, Nova Scotia and Quebec City, Province of Canada, British North America.
Gladiator	United Kingdom	The steamship ran aground of a reef off the coast of Florida, United States. She was on a voyage from London to New Orleans. She was refloated and taken in to Key West, Florida for repairs.
Herman	Flag unknown	The ship was wrecked on Rügen, Prussia.
Hotspur	United Kingdom	The ship was wrecked on the Blowers Reef. Her crew survived. She was on a voyage from Manila, Spanish East Indies to New York.
Lois	United Kingdom	The ship ran aground in the Hooghly River. She was on a voyage from the Cape Colony to Calcutta, India. She was refloated nine days later and completed her voyage.
Kenns	United Kingdom	The ship was driven ashore at Peniche, Portugal. She was on a voyage from Lisbon, Portugal to Saint Petersburg, Russia. She was refloated and put back to Lisbon.
Marins	France	The ship was wrecked at Aigues-Mortes, Gard. She was on a voyage from the Gambia River to Marseille, Bouches-du-Rhône.
Melly	United Kingdom	The ship was lost near Bermuda. She was on a voyage from Mayagüez, Puerto Rico to Falmouth, Cornwall.
Nicholas Curwen	United Kingdom	The ship ran aground in the Hooghly River. She was on a voyage from Bombay to Calcutta.
Nile	United Kingdom	The steamship was driven ashore near Königsberg, Prussia. She was refloated on 12 April.
Oriental	France	The ship foundered in the Indian Ocean. Her crew were rescued. She was on a voyage from Guinea to Marseille.
President Fillmore	United States	The full-rigged ship foundered in the Atlantic Ocean. Her crew were rescued by Sirian Star (United States). President Fillmore was on a voyage from Glasgow to New York.
Scandinavian	United Kingdom	The ship was wrecked on the Conche Reef, off the coast of Florida on or before 16 April. She was on a voyage from Pensacola, Florida to Liverpool, Lancashire.
Sea King	United Kingdom	The barque was sunk by ice in the Saint Lawrence River with the loss of five of her crew. She was on a voyage from Grimsby, Lincolnshire to Quebec City.
St. Mungo	United Kingdom	The ship ran aground in the Hooghly River. She was on a voyage from Calcutta to London. She was refloated and resumed her voyage.
Virginia	United Kingdom	The barque was abandoned in the Atlantic Ocean. She was on a voyage from New York to Donegal. Virginia was discovered on 19 April at 49°20′N 26°18′W by the barque Clydesdale (United Kingdom), which put part of her crew on board to rig a jury mast and take her into a port.
