= Coulter (surname) =

Origin
- Region of origin: Scotland, Ireland

Coulter is a surname of Scottish and Irish origin.

Coulter most likely first originated as a toponymic surname in Scotland among people from areas around Coulter in South Lanarkshire or Maryculter and Peterculter in Aberdeenshire. The etymological origins of these place names may be from Scottish Gaelic cùl tir, meaning 'back land', or (at least in the case of the Lanarkshire village) from a distortion of the Scots language Cootyre, meaning a safe place to store cows.

After the Plantation of Ulster when people with the surname migrated from Scotland to the northernmost province of Ireland, the Irish surname Uí Coltarain, meaning "descendants of Coltarain", appears to have been anglicised to Coulter. The Uí Coltarain were chiefs of the petty-kingdom of Dál Coirbin (within what became the barony of Castlereagh), in the over-kingdom of Ulaid.

== Notable people ==
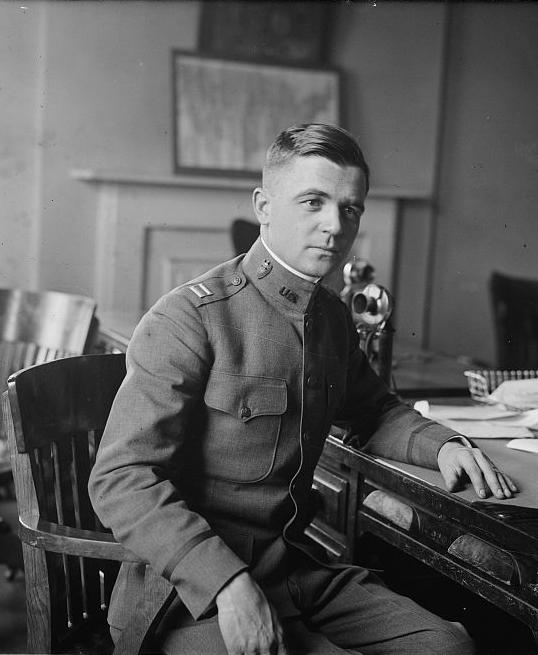
Lt. Gen. John B. Coulter, thrice recipient of the Distinguished Service Medal (US Army)

- Allen Coulter, American director
- Ann Coulter, American author and conservative political commentator
- Ashley Coulter, Canadian singer
- Catherine Coulter, American novelist
- Cornelia C. Coulter (1885–1960), Professor of Latin at Mount Holyoke College
- Dan Coulter (1975–2024), Canadian MLA from British Columbia
- David Coulter (banker) (born 1949), director of Warburg Pincus
- David Coulter (politician), Democratic Party politician and mayor of Ferndale, Michigan
- David Coulter (minister) (born 1957), Church of Scotland minister and RAF chaplain
- David Coulter (karateka), Scottish martial artist
- Declan Coulter, Irish hurler
- E. Merton Coulter, American historian
- Isaiah Coulter (born 1998), American football player
- James Coulter (financier), co-founder of private equity firm TPG Capital
- Jeanelle Coulter, First Lady of North Carolina
- Joey Coulter, race car driver
- John Coulter (politician), Australian politician
- John B. Coulter, American general during the Korean War
- John Merle Coulter, American botanist, brother of Stanley Coulter
- Joseph Coulter, Archdeacon
- Michael Coulter (born 1952), Scottish cinematographer
- Myron L. Coulter (born 1929), University President and Chancellor
- Phil Coulter (born 1942), Irish musician
- Philip B. Coulter (born 1939; Philip Brooks Coulter), American political scientist and professor emeritus (Prof. em.) of political science (lastly at the University of New Orleans/UNO)
- Richard Coulter (US politician), United States Congressman
- Richard Coulter (general), American Civil War general
- Ricki-Lee Coulter, Australian singer
- Robert Coulter (Northern Ireland politician), Northern Irish politician
- Shannon Coulter, founder of #GrabYourWallet consumers-vs-Trump group
- Stanley Coulter, American botanist, brother of John Merle Coulter
- Tex Coulter, Canadian football player
- Thomas Coulter, Irish physician, botanist, and explorer
- Wallace H. Coulter, American inventor and entrepreneur (brother of Joseph Coulter)
- Walter Coulter (1891–1917), Scottish footballer
- William A. Coulter (1849–1936), American marine painter

Fictional characters:

- Eric Coulter, character in Veronica Roth's Divergent trilogy.
- Marisa Coulter, character in Philip Pullman's His Dark Materials trilogy

== Places ==
- In Canada:
  - Coulterville, Ontario
- In the United Kingdom:
  - Coulter, South Lanarkshire
- In the United States:
  - Coulter, Iowa
  - Coulterville, California
  - Coulterville, Illinois
  - Coulterville, Pennsylvania
  - Coulterville, Sale Creek, Tennessee
  - Coulter Creek, Washington

== See also ==
- Beckman Coulter, company
- Coulter (agriculture)
- Coulter counter
- Plant taxa:
  - Coulter's Lupine
  - Coulter's Matilija poppy
  - Coulter pine
  - Coulter's sage
- Recipients of the Legion of Merit § Legionnary, three awards to two people bearing the name
