= George Peabody (pilot boat) =

Boston Pilot boat

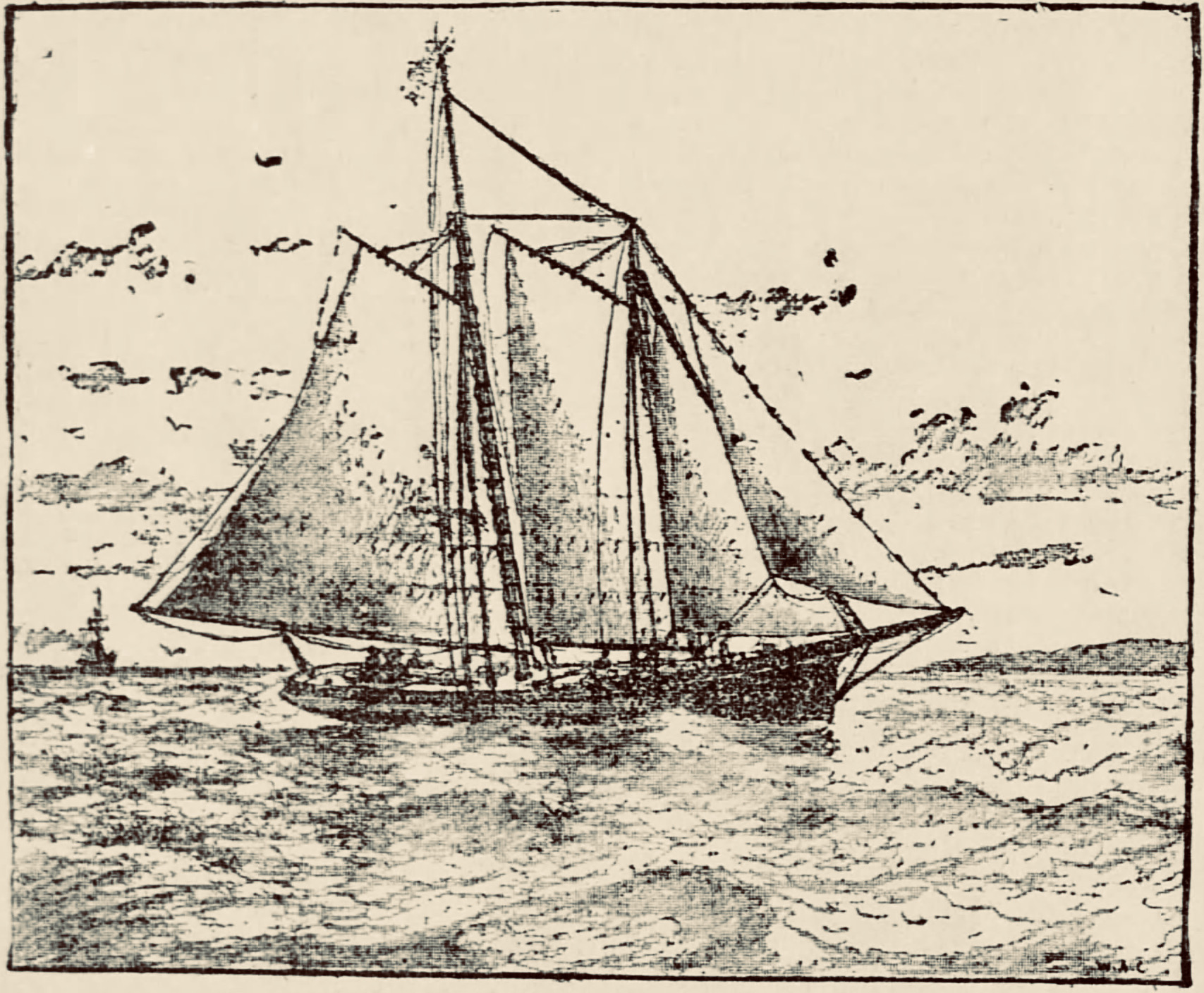
- Pilot boat George Peabody on the coast of Japan. Sketched for The San Francisco Call by William A. Coulter.

History

United States
- Name: George Peabody
- Owner: Boston Pilots; Samuel Henry Burtis
- Operator: Samuel Henry Burtis
- Launched: 1867
- Out of service: December 24, 1893
- Homeport: Port of San Francisco
- Fate: Sank

General characteristics
- Tons burthen: 54 Tonnage
- Length: 71 ft 0 in (21.64 m)
- Beam: 20 ft 8 in (6.30 m)
- Depth: 8 ft 0 in (2.44 m)
- Propulsion: schooner sail
- Sail plan: Schooner-rigged

George Peabody was a 19th-century pilot boat built in Boston, Massachusetts in 1867, for San Francisco pilots. She was in the San Francisco pilot service for twenty-seven years. The Peabody was sold in 1893 to Captain Samuel H. Burtis and sailed to Yokohama, Japan for fishing and Seal hunting. In March 1895, she went ashore off the coast of Japan while working in the sealing trade.

== Construction and service ==
George Peabody, No. 3, was a fast-sailing Boston pilot-boat that was built in 1867, for San Francisco pilots. She was the last of the Boston pilot boats brought to Port of San Francisco for use in the Golden Gate. All the later boats were built in the West Coast. She was a replacement for the San Francisco pilot boat Caleb Curtis, which was wrecked inside the Bonita Channel outside Golden Gate Bridge on April 11, 1867, while attempting to cross the bar on her way to relieve the pilot boat J. C. Cousins. The Peabody was in the pilot service for twenty-seven years. She was 71 feet in length, 20.8 beam, 8 foot depth and 54-tons burden

The George Peabody sailed to San Francisco from Boston on the October 5, 1867. She was cleared for San Francisco with Captain William Chatfield of Thayer & Peabody of Boston. She arrived in San Francisco on February 11, 1868, after a 124-day journey from Boston, via Rio de Janeiro. She was assigned to Stevens and Baker.

On July 6, 1883, the Peabody was rammed by a Mexican steamer General Zaragoza. She was able to reach safety without sinking and was repaired. Captain Turner supervised her repairs.

== End of service ==
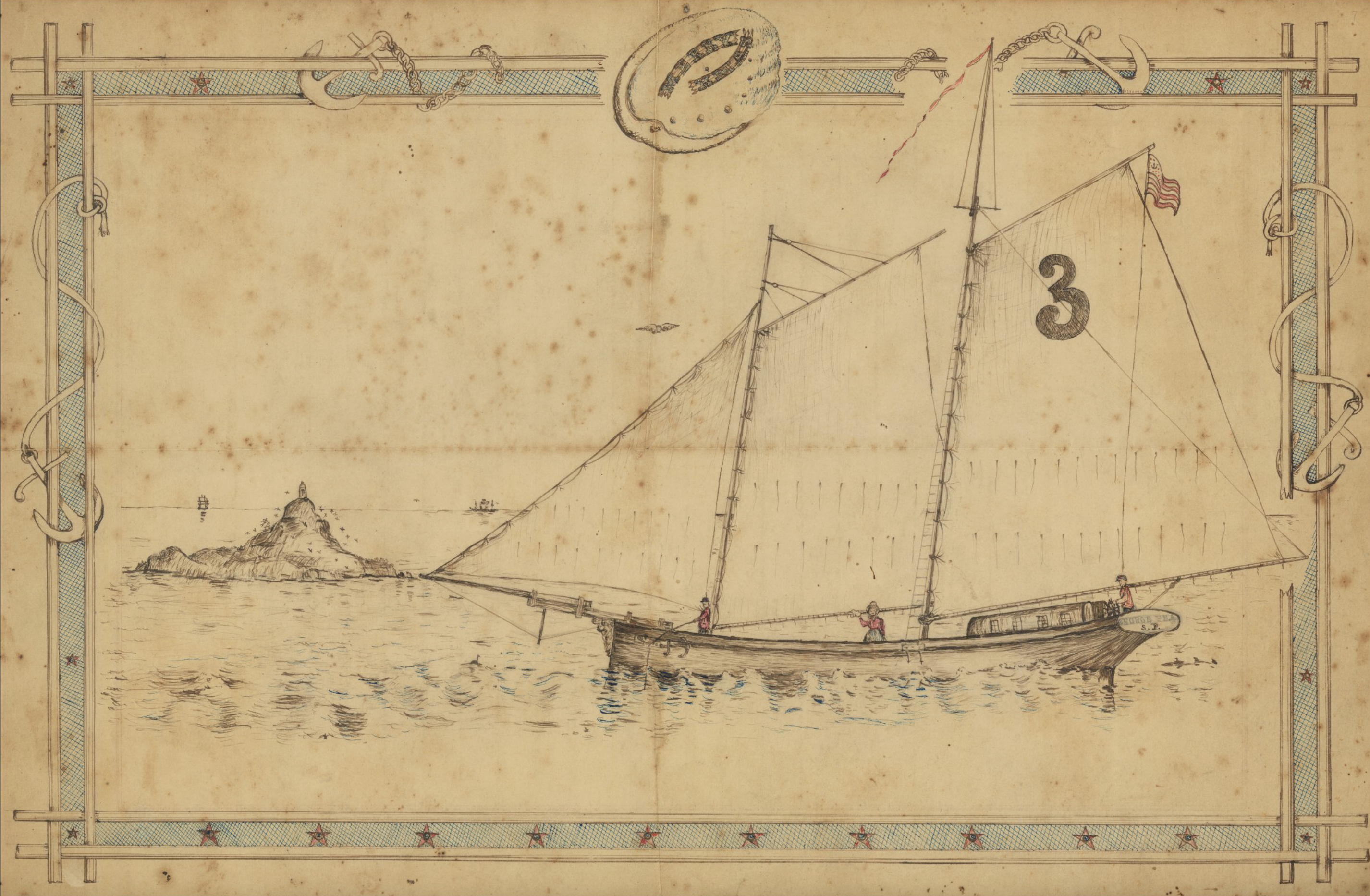
Pilot Schooner George Peabody, No. 3, of San Francisco sailing by the Farallon Islands.

On December 24, 1893, the George Peabody, No. 3, was sold to Captain Samuel Henry Burtis Jr. and others. She was refitted and taken to Yokohama, Japan for fishing and Seal hunting.

In April 1894, the Peabody had a narrow escape when a typhoon broke over the boat near Yokohama. Two men went overboard but were able to swim back to the boat. The captain was able to bring the ship about and the crew were able to bail her out. The weather broke and they were able to safely bring her back to Yokohama.

The Peabody went ashore on the coast of near Yokohama, Japan on March 13, 1895, when she was working in the sealing trade. The crew and a portion of the cargo were saved but the boat was a total loss. She was commanded by Captain Samuel H. Burtis. A sketch was made by William A. Coulter for an article that appeared in The San Francisco Call about the accident.

== See also ==
- List of Northeastern U. S. Pilot Boats
