= GrabYourWallet =

Protest campaign involving Donald Trump

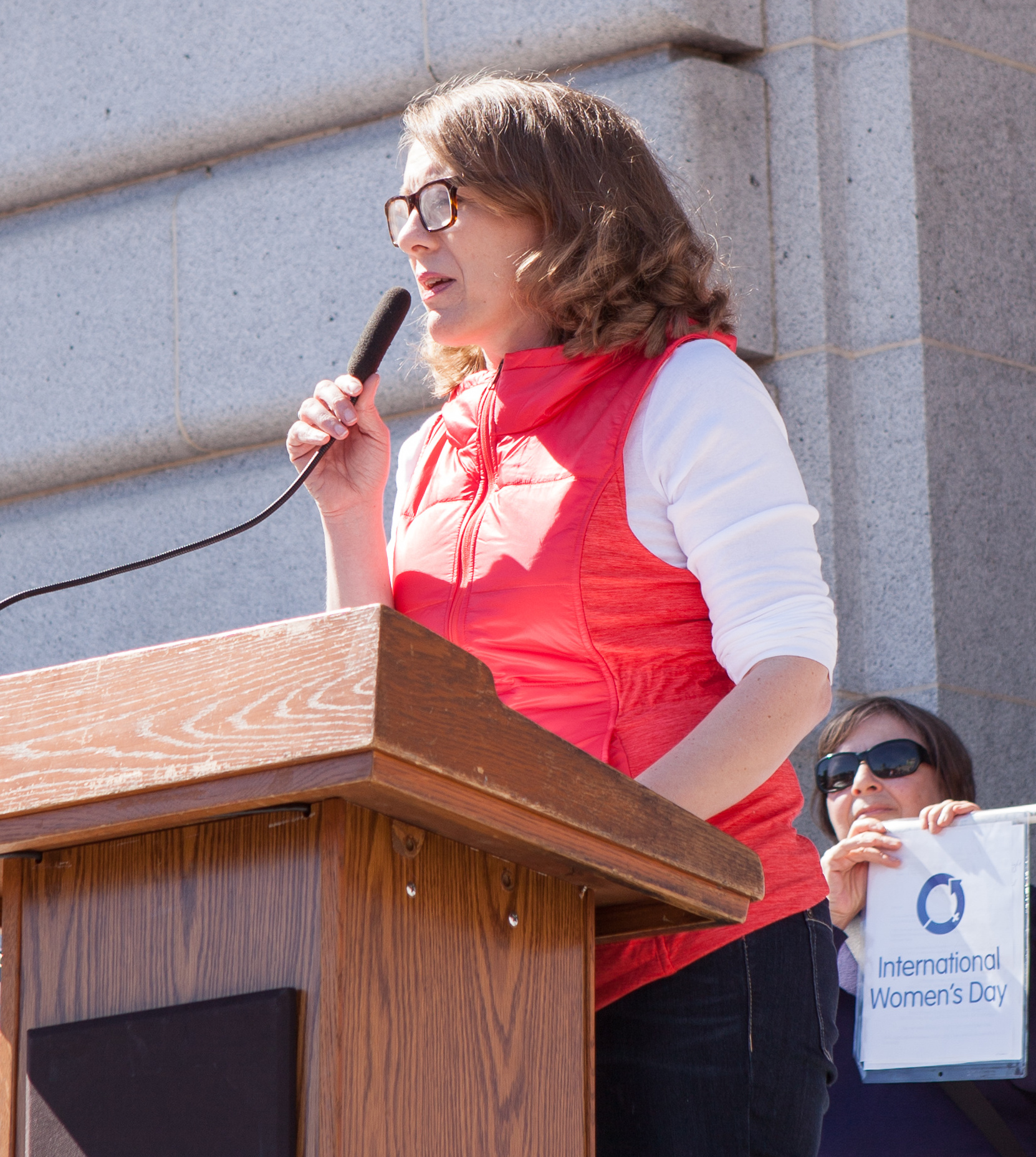
GrabYourWallet founder Shannon Coulter speaks at Day Without a Woman San Francisco, March 2017.

#GrabYourWallet (also Grab Your Wallet) is an organization and social media campaign that is an umbrella term for economic boycotts against companies that have any connections to Donald Trump in response to the leak of a lewd conversation between Donald Trump and Billy Bush on the set of Access Hollywood where he said "grab them by the pussy". The movement has particularly targeted Uber and Trump's daughter Ivanka Trump's clothing and shoe line, which was carried by Nordstrom before being indefinitely discontinued due to poor sales as a result of the boycott.

== History ==
GrabYourWallet was started on October 11, 2016, via Twitter by San Francisco marketing strategist Shannon Coulter, with the help of Sue Atencio. Coulter created a list of stores that carried Trump products after the Access Hollywood tape came out. The news from the tape made her physically ill for a few days. On Twitter, she wrote about her "deep ambivalence" about spending money at a place that sold Trump products. She stated that she wanted "to be able to shop with a clear conscience", and did not feel comfortable purchasing items from those who do business with anyone in the Trump family. The name "GrabYourWallet" is a reference to both Trump's comments about women, and to people using their buying power to influence companies. Coulter emphasizes that the movement is non-partisan, and says, "This is a human decency thing. It's about the divisiveness and disrespectfulness of Donald Trump."

Within a month, Shoes.com dropped Ivanka Trump's brand from their website. Interior design company Bellacor dropped the Trump Home brand in November. Both of these companies contacted supporters of the boycott campaign after dropping the Trump lines. By February 2017, 18 companies had stopped carrying Trump brand merchandise.

After Trump was elected president, Coulter created a spreadsheet of companies that do business with Trump family members and distributed the information online and via social media. The sheet also provides alternatives to stores on the boycott list, and has contact information so that consumers can "express their outrage". #GrabYourWallet as a movement grew larger after the election, partly because the campaign became part of the broader anti-Trump movement. Working on the campaign has almost become a full-time job for Coulter.

Nancy Koehn of Harvard Business School told PBS NewsHour that though boycotting businesses is not new, the scope of #GrabYourWallet is unprecedented. She said that the boycott is unique because it is in "resistance or opposition to the current administration".

On Twitter, more than a combined 626 million impressions have amassed. Twitter users use the hashtag #GrabYourWallet, and some independently tweet at businesses carrying Trump merchandise. Captiv8, a social media influence study group, has found that most engagements with the hashtag come from California and New York.

=== Counter-boycotts ===
Forbes dubbed it the "Trump effect" and "GrabYourWallet effect", given that when people boycott companies, his supporters pledge to start buying those products and vice versa. Trump supporters started boycotting Nordstrom after they dropped Ivanka Trump's line of clothes. They also took to Amazon.com to make Ivanka Trump's fragrance the best selling fragrance on the site for a week.

== Notable boycott targets ==
=== Uber ===
Uber was targeted for its alleged relation to Executive Order 13769, which has also been referred to as a "Muslim ban". As taxi drivers to JFK Airport launched a strike action in solidarity with Muslim refugees, Uber removed surge pricing from the airport where Muslim refugees had been detained upon entry. Uber was also targeted because CEO Travis Kalanick was on President Trump's Strategic and Policy Forum. As a result, a social media campaign called #deleteuber arose and approximately 200,000 users deleted the app. This campaign made Kalanick resign from the council. An email with a statement sent to those who had deleted their accounts said that the company would be assisting refugees and that CEO Kalanick had not joined the council as an endorsement of President Trump. In June 2017, Kalanick resigned as CEO of Uber.

=== Ivanka Trump ===
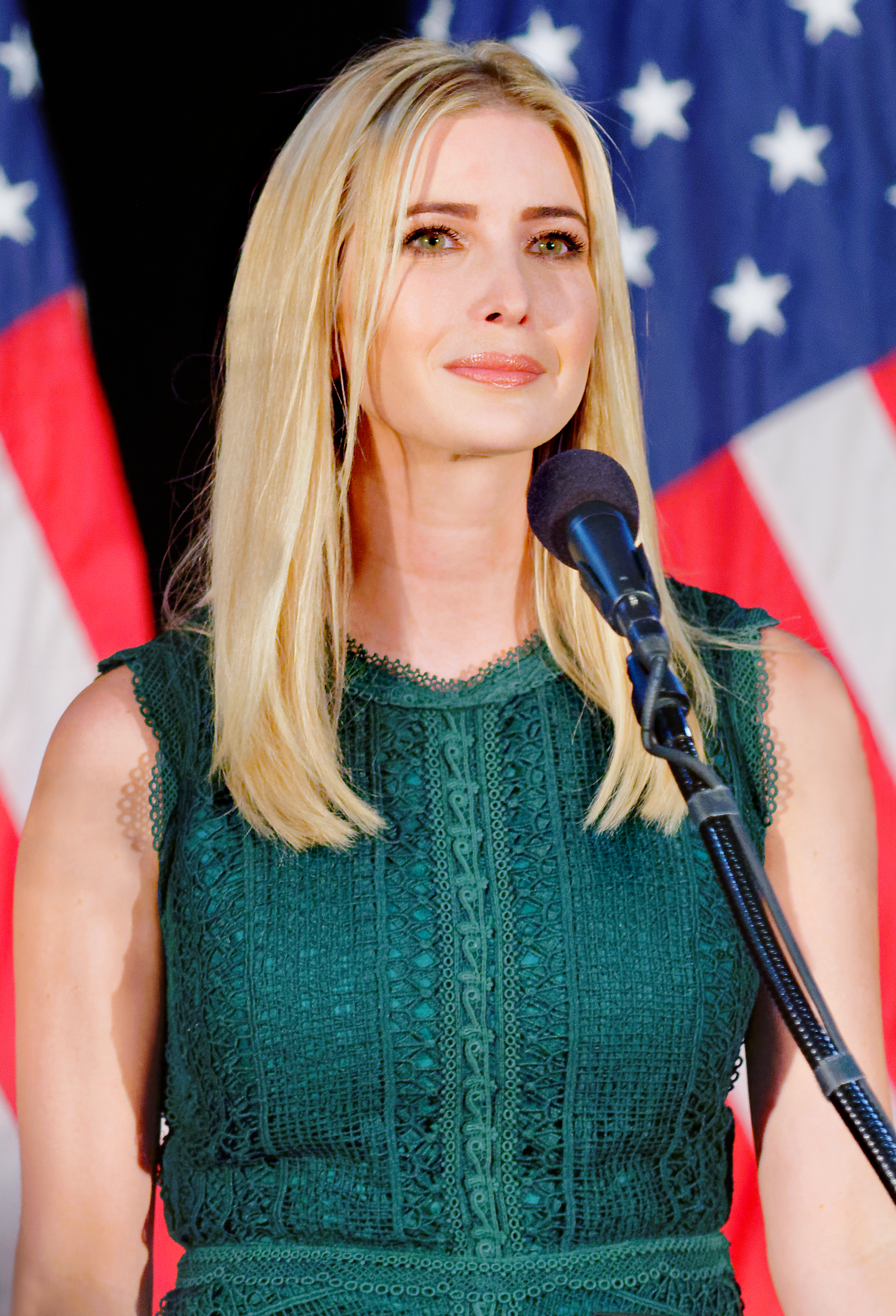
Ivanka Trump in 2016

In the beginning of the proposed boycott, Nordstrom stated that if customers stopped buying Ivanka Trump's line, as a business decision they would stop carrying it (which they did in February 2017). Nordstrom also acknowledged that customers would counter-boycott if they dropped the line. Before the inauguration of President Trump, Ivanka Trump had announced she would be resigning from her fashion brand. Sales of the line started falling before the 2016 election. In February 2017 President Trump expressed his ire at Nordstrom via Twitter, and White House Press Secretary Sean Spicer called the business decision a "direct attack on President Trump". President Trump's tweet caused Nordstrom's shares to temporarily fall, before rising again by 7%.

Macy's customers have also asked that the company drop Ivanka Trump's line.

Ivanka Trump also faced criticism from Coulter when she promoted her $10,800 gold bracelet to fashion writers after wearing it on an interview about her father on 60 Minutes.

== Controversy ==
In February 2017, President Trump's spokeswoman Kellyanne Conway formally endorsed Ivanka Trump's products on Fox News by saying she was giving the brand a "free commercial", telling viewers to buy Ivanka Trump's products. The statement was seen as a violation of federal ethics laws.

== Company lists related to #GrabYourWallet ==
=== Primary targeted companies ===
- Bed Bath & Beyond
- Bloomingdale's
- Dillard's
- Hudson's Bay
- Lord & Taylor
- Macy's
- New Balance
- T.J. Maxx
- Yuengling Brewery
- Zappos
- AT&T
- Estée Lauder Companies

=== Trump-related companies not targeted ===
These companies have been identified by grabyourwallet.org as companies that will not be boycotted though they have a connection to President Trump or family members and their businesses.

- The Washington Post is owned by Jeff Bezos, CEO of Amazon (which indirectly sells Trump products), but the Post has not been targeted since it did critical reporting of President Trump.
- Facebook has not been targeted because of the scope of its user base, and because CEO Mark Zuckerberg has criticized President Trump.
- Delta Air Lines has not been targeted because they do not directly have any business ties to President Trump, though there have been political controversies with certain passengers aboard Delta flights.
- PayPal has not been directly targeted even though co-founder Peter Thiel has endorsed Trump, since he is no longer involved with the company.
- Carrier Corporation has not been boycotted although then-President-Elect Trump was directly involved in keeping 1,000 jobs from moving to Mexico, because they do not do monthly or continued business with any Trump family member.

=== Companies that have cut ties with Trump family as a result ===
- Belk
- Bellacor
- Burlington Coat Factory
- Gilt Groupe
- HSN
- Jet.com
- Kmart
- Marshalls
- Nordstrom
- Sears
- Shoes.com
- ShopStyle
- Uber
