= Trump Home =

Discontinued brand of furniture

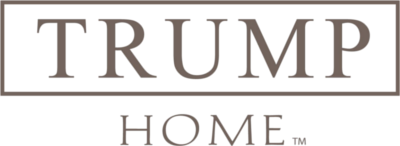
- Industry: Furniture
- Founded: 2007, United States
- Founder: Donald Trump
- Area served: Worldwide
- Owner: The Trump Organization
- Website: www.trump.com/merchandise/trump-home/

Trump Home is a brand of furniture and home items initially marketed by American businessman and current President of the United States Donald Trump and owned by Trump's company, The Trump Organization.

Trump Home was launched in July 2007, with two furniture lines manufactured by Lexington Home Brands. A third furniture line was made available in 2008, at which point the brand was available in more than 18 international territories. A year later, the company partnered with Serta to produce mattresses under the Trump Home name. A line of Trump-branded tabletop crystal, manufactured by a Slovenian company, was launched in 2010. Trump Home has also sold light fixtures, rugs, bath and bedding collections, and a candle and fragrance diffuser collection.

In 2011, Lexington chose not to renew its licensing agreement with Trump Home. Two years later, Trump Home entered a partnership with furniture company Dorya International to manufacture Trump-branded furniture. Serta ended its affiliation with Trump Home after Donald Trump announced his 2016 presidential campaign. Lifestyle, a Dubai-based retailer of Trump Home products, also ended their affiliation with the company in 2015, after Trump announced his presidency plans. Other retailers have discontinued sales of Trump Home products since Trump was elected in November 2016.

== Furniture and decor ==
Trump Home was announced by businessman Donald Trump and Lexington Home Brands on September 28, 2006, as a "luxury" furniture line. Trump said he would be involved in the furniture design process. Several other companies had approached Trump regarding a furniture line. Trump Home was unveiled by Trump during an event at Thomasville Furniture in Thomasville, North Carolina, on March 27, 2007. In April 2007, Lexington was in discussions about including the furniture on the set of Trump's reality television series, The Apprentice. Trump Home is owned by The Trump Organization.

Trump Home was launched with two furniture collections on July 19, 2007, at Macy's flagship store on Herald Square. Trump Home subsequently became available at some Macy's stores and other retailers by the following month. Trump Home featured a formal furniture line known as "Westchester", as well as a modern "Central Park" line. The Los Angeles Times called the Westchester line "heavy on burl and brocade and as over-scaled as the Donald's ego," but wrote that the Central Park line was "a genuinely sophisticated take" on Art Deco. Trump Home rugs, manufactured by Miresco Decorative Rugs, were expected to launch in summer 2007. Trump Home light fixtures, manufactured by ELK Lighting, were expected to go on sale by fall 2007.

In May 2008, Trump Home announced the launch of its Mar-a-Lago collection, named for Trump's Mar-a-Lago property in Palm Beach, Florida. Also announced was a partnership with Imax, an Asian importer, to produce a collection of home accessories and room decorations. In May 2008, the Westchester and Central Park collections were available at hundreds of retailers in the United States. Trump Home was also available in more than 15 international territories.

In October 2010, the company had introduced its Trump Home by Rogaska collection, consisting of tabletop crystal. The collection was manufactured by a company in Slovenia.

In 2011, Lexington Home Brands chose not to renew its Trump licensing agreement and all of its Trump Home products were discontinued. By May 2011, Trump Home also sold a candle and fragrance diffuser collection by Aquiesse. A bath collection, as well as a collaborative bedding collection with Hallmart Collectibles, were scheduled to release later that year. In September 2012, Trump Home announced a new collection of flooring, paneling, and custom wood furniture, to be manufactured by New York-based Archetypal Imagery and to be sold at ABC Carpet & Home, a four-store retailer with locations in New York and New Jersey. The new collection was scheduled to launch the following month.

In September 2013, Trump Home partnered with design company and furniture supplier Dorya International to produce a 50-piece contemporary collection that would debut in Istanbul in February 2014, and High Point, NC in April 2014 followed by expansion into other countries. Dorya manufactured the furniture at its factory in Manisa, Turkey. In June 2015, two Trump Home galleries opened in the United Arab Emirates.

In October 2015, the Trump Home by Dorya collection was expanded to include 70 new pieces. The design team of Ivanka Trump, Donald Trump's daughter, worked with Dorya's design team to create the new pieces. Dorya's president and chief executive officer said that international sales had not been affected by Trump's presidential candidacy or by controversial comments that he had made regarding Mexican immigrants. In December 2015, during the presidential campaign, Trump called for a ban on Muslims entering the United States. Lifestyle, a home decoration retailer based in Dubai, subsequently suspended sales of Trump Home products in its 195 stores across the Middle East, North Africa, Pakistan and Tanzania.

In November 2016, Wayfair discontinued sales of Trump Home products without explanation. Bellacor, a home furnishings company, also discontinued Trump Home products that month, after being targeted by the anti-Trump GrabYourWallet campaign. Bellacor did not comment on the discontinuation. On February 10, 2017, Sears Holdings confirmed that it had removed all 31 Trump Home items from their Sears and Kmart online shops to focus on more profitable items. Neither company sold the products in their retail stores. By that time, the Home Shopping Network (HSN) was no longer selling Trump Home products, although HSN stated that the discontinuation was not politically motivated. Bed Bath & Beyond, which sold Trump Home light fixtures, discontinued sales of the products in March 2017.

== Mattresses ==
In February 2009, the company partnered with mattress manufacturer Serta to release a Trump Home mattress collection. Serta had planned to launch the collection with high pricing, however, the collection priced lower due to the 2008 recession. The mattress collection included 12 innerspring beds and five specialty models. Trump's name was featured on throw pillows, bolsters, and various parts of the mattresses. The mattress line was manufactured in the United States and Canada, and was available in both countries. In Canada, the mattress line went on sale in October 2009, and was available exclusively at The Brick. In April 2010 the companies announced a higher-priced Trump Home Luxury mattress collection.

In May 2012, Trump Home and Serta launched the new Trump Home iSeries mattress collection in Serta stores. In August 2012, Trump Home partnered with luxury bedding manufacturer DOWNLITE to produce a new line of Trump-branded bedding. By April 2014, Trump Home and Serta had launched a redesigned iSeries collection.

When Trump announced his candidacy for the U.S. presidency in June 2015, he referred to some immigrants from Mexico as drug dealers, criminals, and rapists. As a result of Trump's comments, Serta announced on July 1, 2015, that it would not renew its Trump Home licensing agreement, which was set to expire at the end of the year. Serta released a statement saying, "Serta values diversity and does not agree with nor endorse the recent statements made by Mr. Trump."
