= George Peabody (disambiguation) =

George Peabody (1795–1869) was an American financier and philanthropist.

George Peabody may also refer to:

- George Foster Peabody (1852–1938), American banker and philanthropist
- George Peabody (sculpture), by William Wetmore Story
- George Peabody (pilot boat)

== See also ==
- J.S. Morgan & Co., formerly George Peabody & Co.
