= Coalter =

Coalter is a Scottish surname. Notable people with the surname include:

- Gary Coalter (born 1950), Canadian ice hockey player
- John Coalter (1771–1838), American judge

== See also ==
- Coulter (surname)
