= Donald Trump Access Hollywood tape =

Recorded discussion between Donald Trump and Billy Bush in 2005

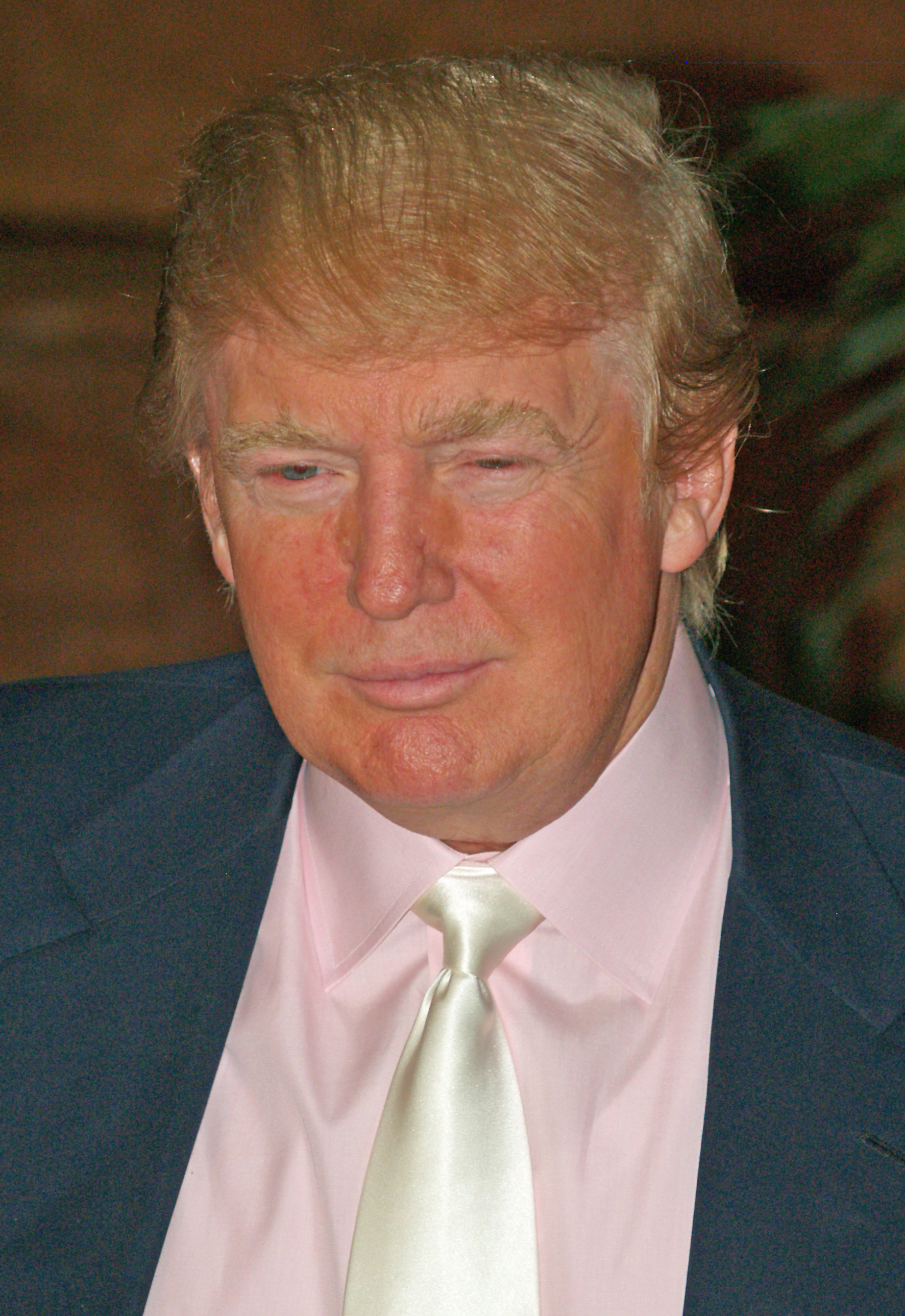
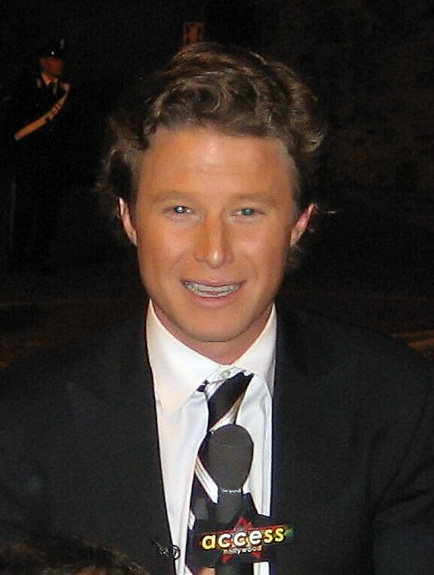
Donald Trump in 2008 and Billy Bush in 2006

On October 7, 2016, one month before the United States presidential election that year, The Washington Post published a video and article about then-presidential candidate Donald Trump and television host Billy Bush having a lewd conversation about women in September 2005. Trump and Bush were on a bus on their way to film an episode of Access Hollywood, a show owned by NBCUniversal. In the video, Trump described his attempt to seduce a married woman and indicated he might start kissing a woman that he and Bush were about to meet. He added, "I don't even wait. And when you're a star, they let you do it. You can do anything. ... Grab 'em by the pussy. You can do anything."

News of the recording broke two days before the second 2016 presidential debate between Trump, the Republican nominee, and Democratic nominee Hillary Clinton. The same day, Trump published a statement in which he apologized for the video's content, while adding that Hillary's husband and former president Bill Clinton had "said far worse to me on the golf course". The following day, Trump released an apology video, calling the remarks "locker room banter" and apologized, stating that "I've said and done things I regret". Bush was fired from his position as a host on Today, another show owned by NBCUniversal and aired on the NBC television network.

Statements from Republican officials varied. Some, including Trump's vice-presidential running mate Mike Pence, Senate majority leader Mitch McConnell, and Republican National Committee chairman Reince Priebus, indicated their disapproval of Trump's words but did not renounce their support or call for his resignation from the ticket. Other Republicans, most prominently former presidential nominee John McCain, stated that they would no longer support Trump's presidential campaign, and some called for his withdrawal from the ticket. House Speaker Paul Ryan announced that he would no longer defend or support Trump's campaign, although he did not officially retract his endorsement of Trump.

Many commentators and lawyers described Trump's comments as sexual assault. Others argued that the remarks were an assertion that sexual consent is easier to obtain for the famous and wealthy. Several women made allegations of sexual misconduct against Trump.

The release of the tape was regarded as an "October surprise", influencing public opinion in the weeks before the election. According to a 2020 study, it reduced public support for Trump. Despite the controversy, Trump ultimately won the 2016 election.

Trump was shown the tape during an October 2022 deposition for a civil lawsuit brought by author E. Jean Carroll, who accused Trump of raping her in 1995 or 1996. In response to questions from Carroll's attorney about whether the statements in the tape were true, Trump replied, "historically, that's true with stars" and "if you look over the last million years, I guess that's been largely true. Not always, but largely true. Unfortunately, or fortunately." The tape was used as evidence during the trial. On May 9, 2023, a jury found Trump liable for sexual abuse and defamation against Carroll and ordered him to pay her $5 million. On July 19, 2023, Judge Kaplan denied Donald Trump's request for a new trial.

== Recording ==
The video was recorded on Friday, September 16, 2005 in the NBC Studios parking lot while Trump was preparing to appear in an episode of the NBC soap opera Days of Our Lives. Access Hollywood, a syndicated entertainment news program owned by NBCUniversal, conducted a behind-the-scenes interview with Trump about the guest appearance in which Trump and Bush arrived in a tour bus for the Access Across America series of segments produced in commemoration of the program's 10th season. It features audio of Trump talking with Billy Bush, then co-anchor of Access Hollywood, on a bus embellished with the show's name. Trump and Bush were wearing microphones, which recorded their casual conversation. Trump was later described as "apparently aware at the time that he was being recorded by a TV program".

According to an Access Hollywood spokesperson, there were seven other people on the bus: a camera crew of two, the bus driver, the show's producer, a production assistant, Trump's security guard, and Trump's public relations representative. Upon arriving at the lot, the camera crew was let off the bus so they could record Trump and Bush disembarking and meeting with Arianne Zucker, who portrayed Nicole Walker on the soap opera and appeared alongside Trump in the episode in which he guest starred.

=== Contents ===
In the video, Trump tells Bush about a failed attempt to seduce Nancy O'Dell, who was Bush's co-host at the time (circa 2005) of the recording:

I moved on her, and I failed. I'll admit it.

I did try and fuck her. She was married.

And I moved on her very heavily. In fact, I took her out furniture shopping. She wanted to get some furniture. I said, "I'll show you where they have some nice furniture." I took her out furniture—I moved on her like a bitch. But I couldn't get there. And she was married. Then all of a sudden I see her, she's now got the big phony tits and everything. She's totally changed her look.

Later, referring to Arianne Zucker (whom they were waiting to meet), Trump says:

I better use some Tic Tacs just in case I start kissing her. You know I'm automatically attracted to beautiful—I just start kissing them. It's like a magnet. Just kiss. I don't even wait. And when you're a star, they let you do it. You can do anything. Grab 'em by the pussy. You can do anything.

== Publication ==
According to Access Hollywood, the discovery of the video was prompted by "Mr. Trump's denial of claims contained in an Associated Press story in which 20 former Apprentice employees described Mr. Trump's behavior toward women as lewd and inappropriate." An NBC source said that an Access Hollywood producer remembered the conversation on October 3, 2016, and located it in the show's archives. The celebrity news website TMZ reports a different chronology: when senior executives at NBC learned about the video, they thought it was too early in the presidential campaign season to release it with maximum effect, and (according to TMZ) those executives publicly said they learned of the video long after they actually learned about it.

NBC discussed whether to release the tape and had lawyers review the legality of the publication, as is common among other news media due to the possibility that the involved parties might file a lawsuit if the video was released. By October 4, NBC had drafted a story that it declined to broadcast for another three days. On October 7, at around 11 a.m., an unidentified source gave a copy of the tape to Washington Post reporter David Fahrenthold, who contacted NBC for comment, notified the Trump campaign that he had the video, obtained confirmation of its authenticity, and released a story and the tape itself by 4 p.m. Alerted that the Post might release the story immediately, NBC News released its own story "mere minutes" after the Post story was published.

By that evening, the Post's story had become "the most concurrently viewed article in the history of the Post's website" with more than 100,000 people reading it on the afternoon of October 7. The Post's servers went offline for a short period that day due to the surge in web traffic. This story would later be one of the articles for which Fahrenthold received the Pulitzer Prize for National Reporting.

== Reactions ==
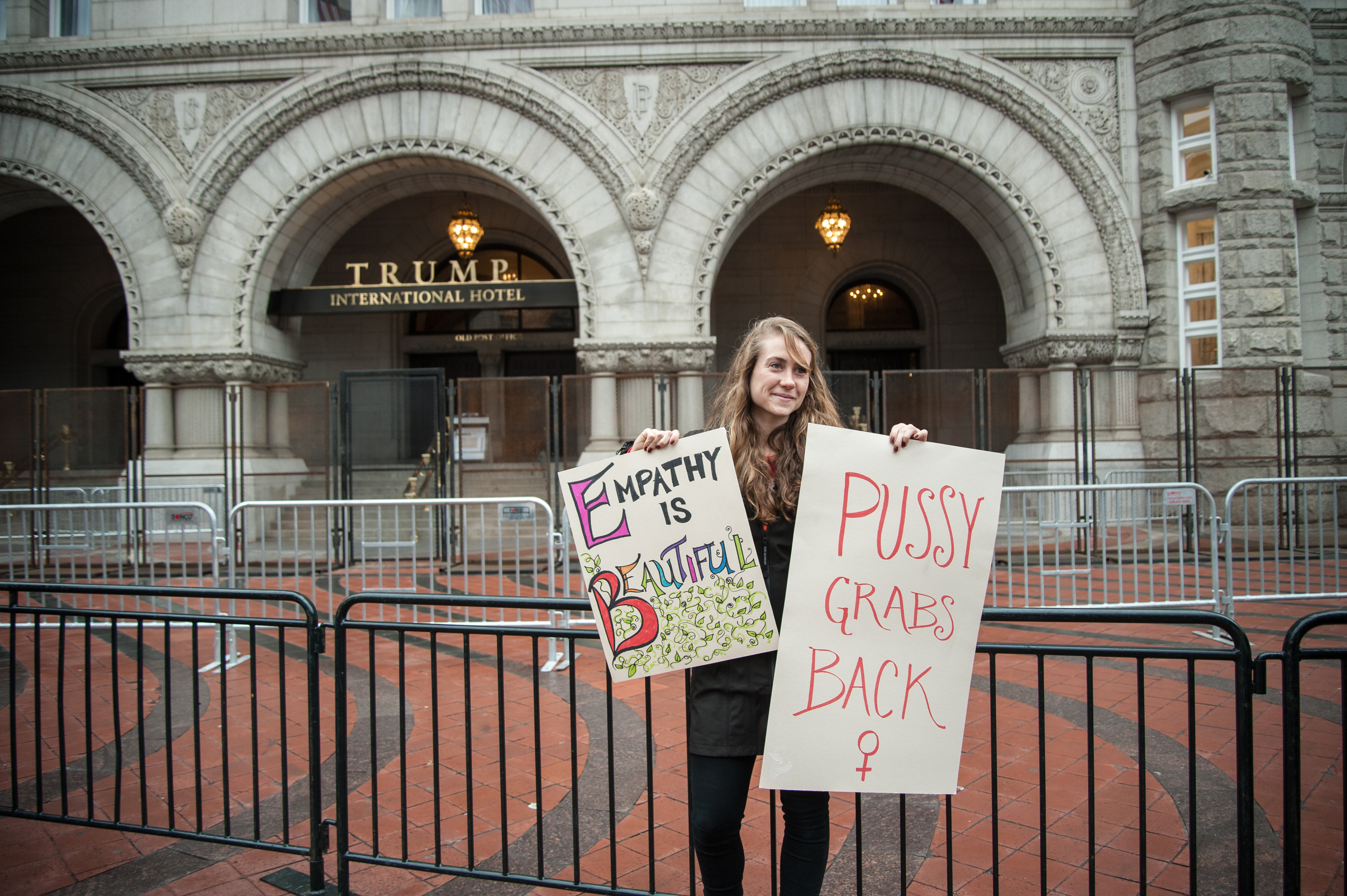
Demonstrator in front of the Trump International Hotel in Washington, D.C. during the Women's March on Washington

Reaction was swift, with Trump's general election opponent Hillary Clinton among the first political figures to respond to the tape, tweeting shortly after its release, "This is horrific. We cannot allow this man to become president." Clinton's VP running mate Tim Kaine said of the tape, "It makes me sick to my stomach ... I'm sad to say that I'm not surprised." At the second presidential debate two days later, Clinton said of the tape, "With prior Republican nominees for president, I disagreed with them, politics, policies, principles, but I never questioned their fitness to serve. Donald Trump is different."

In the second episode of season 42 of Saturday Night Live (first aired on October 8), Alec Baldwin parodied the controversy as Trump. Samantha Bee, the host of Full Frontal with Samantha Bee, reversed the gender roles in the video and issued an "apology" for the parodied video on Twitter. Singer-songwriter Carly Simon donated her 1972 song "You're So Vain" for use in an anti-Trump advertisement – the first time she has ever allowed its use for political purposes – and announced her opposition to Trump in response to the tape.

=== Media and legal profession attention ===
Touching a person's genitals without consent (also known as groping) is considered sexual assault in most jurisdictions in the United States. Many attorneys and media commentators characterized Trump's statements as describing acts of sexual assault. Lisa Bloom, a sexual harassment expert and civil rights lawyer, stated: "Let's be very clear, he is talking about sexual assault. He is talking about grabbing a woman's genitals without her consent." Trump and some of his supporters claimed that Trump was not saying he had committed a sexual assault or had denied that groping is sexual assault. Journalist Emily Crockett says that this is further evidence of a trend to minimize sexual assaults against women.

John Banzhaf, a George Washington University public interest law professor, stated, "if Trump suddenly and without any warning reached out and grabbed a woman's crotch or breast, it would rather clearly constitute sexual assault", as indicated in Trump's statement "I don't even wait." It has been argued, however, that despite Trump having stated "I don't even wait", his full remarks do imply consent. This is pointed out by Trump's full remarks having included the statement "and when you're a star, they let you do it. You can do anything."

It brought further media comment on Trump's history of criticizing women for their looks, among other remarks criticized as sexist. On October 8, CNN aired segments from multiple interviews Trump gave to The Howard Stern Show prior to his political career in which he made comments similar to those on the Access Hollywood tape. In September 2004, Trump comments on his daughter Ivanka's body and, when asked, tells Stern that it is okay for him to call his daughter "a piece of ass".

=== Involved parties ===
==== Billy Bush ====
While the controversy focused mainly on Trump, Bush also faced backlash as a result of the tape, mainly due to his statement that Zucker "[is] hot as shit" and his goading her into hugging Trump after they get off the bus. Bush received online criticism and calls for his resignation from The Today Show, where he was an anchor at the time. The Washington Post stated, "Bush's public image was damaged—perhaps beyond repair." There were so many negative comments on Bush's social media accounts following the tape's release that his Twitter account was taken down on the evening of October 7. That evening, Bush issued an apology, saying, "Obviously I'm embarrassed and ashamed. It's no excuse, but this happened eleven years ago—I was younger, less mature, and acted foolishly in playing along. I'm very sorry."

The controversy led to speculation that Bush's spot on Today could be in jeopardy, both because of the backlash against him on social media and the possibility that the tape's release could create a toxic work environment between Bush and the show's mostly female production staff. NBC executives confirmed on the evening of October 8 that Bush's job was safe and he would address the controversy on the October 10 episode of Today. Politico noted that the audience of Today is disproportionately female so that a significant ratings drop in the wake of the controversy could still lead to Bush's dismissal. On Monday, October 10, NBC reversed course and announced that Bush would be suspended from Today indefinitely pending further review; as he was an anchor, his suspension was briefly addressed during that day's broadcast. One day later, on October 11, multiple media sources reported that NBC was "negotiating his exit". On October 17, NBC announced that Bush had resigned.

Bush's status as a member of the Bush family (specifically, as the cousin of former president George W. Bush and the nephew of former president George H. W. Bush) was also noted in the wake of the controversy. The Economist noted, "Who would have thought that Mr. Bush, a presenter of NBC's Today news show, could end up playing a more influential role in this election than his cousin Jeb, whom many Republicans had expected to win it?"

==== People and entities mentioned by Trump ====
Nancy O'Dell, the married woman of whom Trump spoke, said:

Politics aside, I'm saddened that these comments still exist in our society at all. When I heard the comments yesterday, it was disappointing to hear such objectification of women. The conversation needs to change because no female, no person, should be the subject of such crass comments, whether or not cameras are rolling. Everyone deserves respect no matter the setting or gender. As a woman who has worked very hard to establish her career, and as a mom, I feel I must speak out with the hope that as a society we will always strive to be better.

In response to having their product referenced by Trump on the tape, Tic Tac issued a statement on Twitter stating, "Tic Tac respects all women. We find the recent statements and behavior completely inappropriate and unacceptable."

Reacting to her unwitting role in this incident, Zucker wrote on TwitLonger, "How we treat one another, whether behind closed doors, locker rooms or face to face, should be done with kindness, dignity and respect."

=== Melania Trump ===
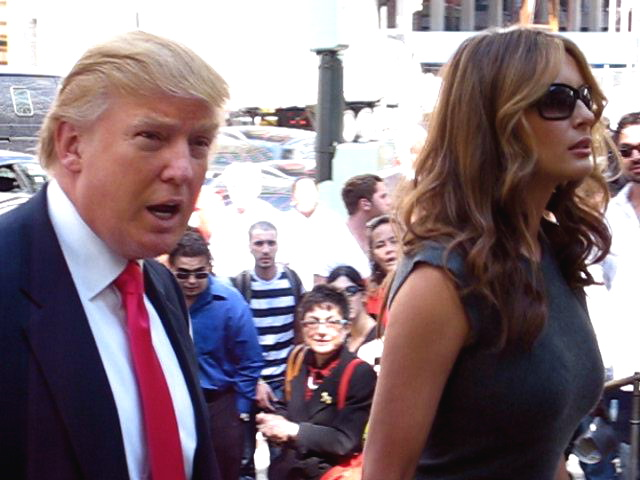
Trump and his wife Melania

The tape had been recorded shortly after Trump's marriage to his third wife, Melania, while she was pregnant with their son Barron. According to Chris Christie, Trump dreaded his next encounter with his wife after the tape leaked. It took him two hours from hearing the tape before he went to see her. The campaign was most concerned about her response, as it more than any other had the potential to derail Trump's candidacy. When they spoke about the tape privately, she reportedly said "now you could lose, you could have blown this for us" and then left the room after hearing her husband's apology.

Melania was frustrated by the pity directed toward her. She wished to make her own response independently from the campaign's planned response. When the campaign's strategy was proposed, she only replied "no". Melania decided to put out her own statement, and Donald only asked to read it before she spoke to the press. Her statement read:

The words my husband used are unacceptable and offensive to me. This does not represent the man that I know. He has the heart and mind of a leader. I hope people will accept his apology, as I have, and focus on the important issues facing our nation and the world.

Melania's first media appearance after the tape leaked was an interview with Anderson Cooper, who expressed sympathy for her throughout the interview. She stated that she would not relay what she and her husband said in private conversations, but that she was "very strong" and "very confident". In the interview, Melania argued that her husband supports women, and she blamed the controversy on a conspiracy by "left-wing media". She asked people not to feel sorry for her, directing criticism toward celebrities who spoke out on her behalf, which she found hypocritical. During the next presidential debate, Melania attended wearing a pussy bow, causing speculation that it was a reference to the tape.

=== Republican Party ===
The incident was condemned by numerous prominent Republicans. Republican National Committee (RNC) Chairman Reince Priebus said, "No woman should ever be described in these terms or talked about in this manner. Ever." The RNC suspended all support of Trump's campaign shortly thereafter. Former Massachusetts governor Mitt Romney, the Republican presidential nominee in 2012, tweeted, "Hitting on married women? Condoning assault? Such vile degradations demean our wives and daughters and corrupt America's face to the world." Ohio governor John Kasich, a former primary rival to Trump, called the remarks "indefensible"; former Florida governor Jeb Bush, also a former primary rival, called them "reprehensible". Senate Majority Leader Mitch McConnell also denounced the video, but continued to support Trump. Paul Ryan, the House Speaker, disinvited Trump from a scheduled campaign rally, announced that he would no longer defend or support Trump's presidential campaign, and in a highly unusual move freed down-ticket congressional members to use their own judgment, saying "you all need to do what's best for you and your district"; he did not, however, withdraw his endorsement of Trump.

Many members of the Republican Party rescinded their endorsements as a result of the release of the video, including Governors Bill Haslam and Robert J. Bentley; Representatives Bradley Byrne, Jason Chaffetz, and Joe Heck; and Senators Kelly Ayotte, Mike Crapo, and John McCain. Former California governor Arnold Schwarzenegger, who had previously kept his opinion private throughout the campaign, released a statement: "For the first time since I became a citizen in 1983, I will not vote for the Republican candidate for president ... As proud as I am to label myself a Republican, there is one label that I hold above all else—American." By October 11, "nearly a third" of Senate Republicans said they would not vote for Trump. Other Republicans expressed continued support for Trump, including former 2016 Republican candidate Ben Carson, evangelical leaders Tony Perkins and Ralph E. Reed Jr., and former Trump campaign manager Corey Lewandowski. Other evangelical leaders, particularly the Southern Baptist Convention Ethics and Policy Director, Dr. Russell D. Moore, publicly rebuked evangelical leaders who still supported Trump. In a tweet, Ted Cruz questioned why NBC, who had possession of the tape, sat on it for 11 years.

==== Calls to drop campaign ====
By October 8, several dozen Republicans had called for Trump to withdraw from the campaign and let his VP running mate, Mike Pence, take over the Republican ticket. Among those favoring a Pence takeover were former Utah governor Jon Huntsman Jr., U.S. Senators Dan Sullivan of Alaska, Cory Gardner of Colorado and Deb Fischer of Nebraska, and U.S. Representatives Jason Chaffetz of Utah, Bradley Byrne of Alabama, Rodney Davis of Illinois, and Ann Wagner of Missouri.

Pence himself released a statement on October 8, saying, "As a husband and father, I was offended by the words and actions described by Donald Trump in the eleven-year-old video released yesterday ... I do not condone his remarks and cannot defend them." However, he said he still supported Trump since he "has expressed remorse and apologized to the American people."

Trump insisted he would never drop out. As of October 8, depending upon the state:

- It was not possible to change the names on ballots at the late date for purely legal reasons.
- Many general election ballots had already been printed, and it would be expensive to change them.
- In states with early voting, thousands of ballots had already been cast.

For these reasons, commentators said that it would have been very difficult, if not impossible, to replace Trump as the Republican nominee.

==== Withdrawal of political support ====
As the day wore on, a growing number of Republicans went beyond criticizing Trump's remarks or rescinding endorsements of him and began calling for Trump to drop out of the presidential race, ceding the Republican nomination to another person. On the afternoon of October 8, Trump responded with a tweet: "The media and establishment want me out of the race so badly - I WILL NEVER DROP OUT OF THE RACE, WILL NEVER LET MY SUPPORTERS DOWN! #MAGA".

The Republican National Committee continued to support Trump, and within the next couple of days, several of the Republicans who wanted Trump to drop out said that they were still voting for him. Steve Bannon said in an interview on 60 Minutes that response to the controversy served as a "litmus test" for Trump's Republican allies. For example, according to Bannon, Chris Christie was denied a Cabinet position because he said Trump's comments were "completely indefensible".

== Trump's responses ==
External videos
- Donald Trump apologizes for sexist comments about groping women on YouTube via PBS Newshour, October 7, 2016

Trump acknowledged making the remarks, but said that Bill and Hillary Clinton had said and done worse.

After the release of the Access Hollywood video, Trump's first public response came in the form of a written statement published on his campaign website:

This was locker room banter, a private conversation that took place many years ago. Bill Clinton has said far worse to me on the golf course - not even close. I apologize if anyone was offended.

Early on Saturday morning, October 8, Donald Trump issued a lengthier statement by video. In it, Trump said of the video's contents, "I said it, I was wrong, and I apologize." He went on to "pledge to be a better man", ending the video by alleging Bill Clinton had "abused women", and that Hillary Clinton had bullied her husband's victims. Trump's video ended with assurances that the Clinton allegations would be discussed in coming days. Trump's statement was criticized severely by the media and members of the public as insincere, and an attempt to divert attention away from Trump's comments and onto whataboutist accusations against his political opponents. Trump tweeted the next day: "Certainly has been an interesting 24 hours!" On October 10, Trump was also questioned about the tape during the second presidential debate of his campaign. He reiterated that it was "locker room talk", then said, "I'm not proud of it. I apologize to my family. I apologize to the American people."

In 2017, it was reported that Trump had questioned the authenticity of the tape in multiple private conversations that year, including one with a Republican senator, even though he had already acknowledged that the voice was his, and apologized, after the tape was revealed.

In January 2017, shortly before his inauguration, Trump told a Republican senator that he wanted to investigate the recording.

== Effects and aftermath ==
=== Clinton–Trump debates ===
The release of the tape led to a renewed anticipation towards the October 9 debate between Trump and Hillary Clinton, as it would be the first time for each candidate to directly address the controversy. Less than two hours before the debate began, Trump held a surprise press conference in St. Louis with Paula Jones, Kathleen Willey, and Juanita Broaddrick, who have previously accused Bill Clinton of sexual misconduct, and Kathy Shelton, a rape victim whose rapist had been represented in the 1970s by Hillary, an appointed public defender. Describing the conference as his "debate prep", Trump described the women as "courageous" and "victims of the Clintons", with each of the women repeating their grievances with the Clintons. At the conference, Trump refused to answer journalists' questions about the Access Hollywood tape. Clinton's campaign dismissed the conference as "an act of desperation" and denounced Trump's "destructive race to the bottom". First Lady Michelle Obama said referring to the controversy, "It has shaken me to my core in a way that I couldn't have predicted."

The New York Times reported that just before the press conference, advisers to the Trump campaign told Reince Priebus that Trump had to leave to attend a "meet and greet" because they feared that "Priebus would object if he knew the truth". Campaign chairman Steve Bannon told Trump, "[Broaddrick, Jones, Shelton, and Willey are] going to rub up on you and be crying... [a]nd you're going to be empathetic." In response, Bannon recalled, Trump closed his eyes, moved his head back "like a Roman emperor", and said "I love it". Juanita Broaddrick told the Times she had "no idea what we were going in there for... [b]ut that doesn't matter. I would do it all again."

During the debate itself, co-moderator Anderson Cooper pressed Trump about whether the conversation on the tape meant that Trump had committed sexual assault. Trump said it "was locker room talk" and "I'm not proud of it", and said he wanted to move on to other things, but finally responded "I have not." It was later revealed that Trump had arranged for the women from his press conference to sit in his family box and that they were to walk into the audience at the same time as Bill Clinton and confront him on live TV, but debate officials intervened and prevented the planned stunt from happening. The Associated Press later reported that Willey and Shelton had previously been financially compensated by Trump ally Roger Stone during the campaign.

=== Assault stories ===
Shortly after the story first broke on October 7, Canadian writer Kelly Oxford posted on Twitter, "Women: tweet me your first assaults. they aren't just stats." Within hours, the tweet had gone viral, receiving thousands of responses, many of them relating to stories of sexual assaults on women. Over 30 million people viewed or replied to Oxford's tweet within a week.

=== Response of athletes and coaches ===
News report of voter reactions by Voice of America

Numerous professional athletes and coaches rejected Trump's claim that what he said on the tape was "locker room talk", saying that such comments were not normal or acceptable. Los Angeles Clippers head coach Doc Rivers said, "[If Trump's comments are locker room talk] that's a new locker room for me." Oakland Athletics pitcher Sean Doolittle tweeted, "As an athlete, I've been in locker rooms my entire adult life and uh, that's not locker room talk." Kansas City Chiefs wide receiver Chris Conley tweeted, "Just for reference. I work in a locker room (every day) ... that is not locker room talk. Just so you know". Los Angeles Dodgers pitcher Brett Anderson tweeted, "What kind of fucked up locker rooms has Donald Trump been in". NBA point guard Kendall Marshall tweeted, "PSA: sexual advances without consent is NOT locker room talk." LA Galaxy midfielder Robbie Rogers tweeted, "I'm offended as an athlete that @realDonaldTrump keeps using this "locker room talk" as an excuse." Olympic hurdler and sprinter Queen Harrison tweeted, "Locker room talk,' 'Boys will be boys,' 'Harmless banter.' These are not valid excuses for behavior. Never have been, never will be." Atlanta Falcons tight end Jacob Tamme tweeted, "It's not normal. And even if it were normal, it's not right." These responses also prompted the creation of the hashtag #NotInMyLockerRoom.

Eleven months after the footage was leaked, retired professional boxer Floyd Mayweather defended Trump's comments stating, "People don't like the truth ... He speak like a real man spoke. ... So he talking locker room talk. Locker room talk. 'I'm the man, you know what I'm saying? You know who I am. Yeah, I grabbed her by the pussy. And?'"

=== Anti-Trump memes and campaigns ===
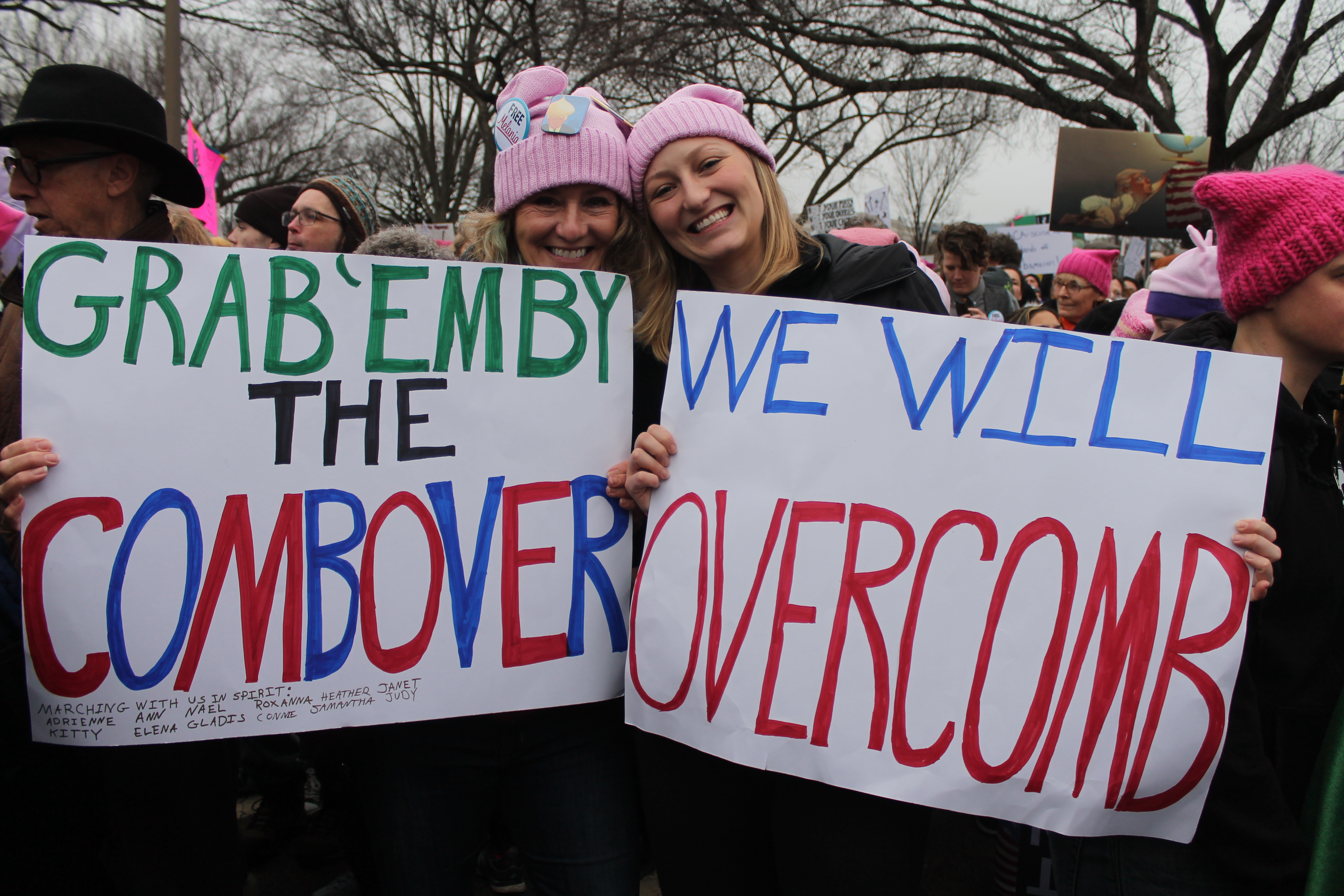
Protester sign "Grab 'em by the combover" (reference to Trump's comb over hairstyle), Washington DC, 2017

The backlash from the comments prompted a "Pussy Grabs Back" hashtag urging women to vote against Trump on Election Day. Anti-Trump memes featuring cat imagery spread on social media. The Guardian wrote that an image of a snarling cat became a "rallying cry for female rage against Trump".

Trump's denial that he ever kissed or groped women without consent led to more accusations by several women that Trump sexually assaulted them. Trump's campaign denied the allegations.

In response to the recording, Shannon Coulter started a viral campaign called #GrabYourWallet, which urges individuals to boycott various companies that sell Trump-related products. Various companies have since dropped Trump's products in response to the boycott, including Shoes.com, Nordstrom, Bergdorf Goodman, and Neiman Marcus.

=== Alleged other tapes ===
On October 9, former staffers of Trump's reality show The Apprentice and journalist Geraldo Rivera said that they both individually have more damaging tapes of Trump, but did not say if they would be released to the public. Rivera later stated that he had searched his files and that he could not find anything relevant to the scandal.

Since the tape's release, Bill Pruitt, a producer of the first two seasons of the television series The Apprentice, claims there is behind-the-scenes footage of Trump saying things that are "far worse". NBCUniversal's news division does not have access to the archives of the series. Another Apprentice producer, Chris Nee, claimed on Twitter that Trump said "the N-word" in the archived footage. Nee later deleted the tweet. A GoFundMe campaign was launched on October 9 with the goal of raising $5.1 million to release more tapes. The campaign is known as the "Trump Sunlight Campaign". Nee wrote on Twitter to Mark Cuban that there is a $5 million penalty fee if the footage is leaked. David Brock also offered to pay the penalty to release the alleged tapes from The Apprentice. By election day, the "Sunlight campaign" had raised $40,000. No tape was found as a result of the campaign. In December 2017, the organizer Aaron Holman posted an update stating that he would donate $25,000 of the fundraised amount to The Nation Institute, with the remaining used to reimburse expenses of "investigative work" done by the campaign.

=== E. Jean Carroll defamation lawsuit ===
In Trump's late 2022 deposition for E. Jean Carroll's defamation lawsuit against him (related to her accusation that Trump raped her in the mid-1990s and his response while U.S. president), Trump was questioned about whether he made the statements in the tape, to which he replied, "Well, historically, that's true with stars." Carroll's lawyers cited the statements as corroborating a larger pattern of sexual abuse by Trump, and his lawyers requested that the tape be disregarded as evidence in the trial. The jurors viewed the tape during trial and went on to find Trump liable for battery and defamation against Carroll.

After the jury in the case awarded Carroll $5 million, finding Trump liable for sexual abuse, Trump requested a new trial. In declining this request, Kaplan cited, among other things, the Access Hollywood tape in his decision, saying, "Mr. Trump's own words from the Access Hollywood tape and from his deposition – that (a) stars '[u]nfortunately or fortunately' 'c[ould] do anything' they wished to do to women, including 'grab[bing] them by the pussy' and (b) he considers himself to be a 'star' – could have been regarded by the jury as a sort of personal confession as to his behavior."

== See also ==
- 2017 Women's March
- Stormy Daniels–Donald Trump scandal
- Protests against Donald Trump
- Tiny Hands
- MeToo movement
- October surprise
