= Dancing Feather =

Boston Pilot boat

History

United States
- Name: Dancing Feather
- Owner: Boston and San Francisco Pilots
- Operator: James L. Fowler
- Builder: Dennison J. Lawlor
- Cost: $10,000
- Launched: 1853
- Out of service: May 1857
- Fate: Sank

General characteristics
- Class & type: schooner
- Length: 68 ft 0 in (20.73 m)
- Beam: 20 ft 0 in (6.10 m)
- Depth: 8 ft 0 in (2.44 m)
- Propulsion: Sail

The Dancing Feather was a 19th-century pilot boat, built in 1853 at the Dennison J. Lawlor shipyard in East Boston, Massachusetts. She went to San Francisco in 1853. The Dancing Feather met up with the wreck SS Yankee Blade in 1854 and was able to raise four boxes of treasure from the sunken vessel. In 1857, she went ashore on the beach north of Point Bonita in San Francisco Bay.

== Construction and service ==
The wooden pilot-boat Dancing Feather was built in 1853, from a model by the noted Boston builder and designer, Dennison J. Lawlor, at the Lawlor shipyard of East Boston, Massachusetts. She was a schooner-rigged vessel with a clipper sharp bow and round stern. Her dimensions were 68 ft. in length; 20 ft. breadth of beam; and 8 ft. depth of hold. The half-model of the Dancing Feather (TR.076032) was a gift by D. J. Lawlor to the Watercraft collection in the "United States National Museum" now the Smithsonian Institution. She was painted black, green below the water, with gold leaf trim for her trailboards.

The Dancing Feather sailed in April 1853 from Boston to Cape Horn to get to San Francisco, with Captain James L. Fowler, his son pilot Franklin Fowler, and pilot Warren Simpson.

After losing the Dancing Feather in 1853 to the newly established San Francisco Merchant Line, the Daniel Webster, was purchased by the San Francisco Pilots' Old Line in October 1853.

In December 1854, Captain Fowler was in command of the pilot boat Dancing Feather when he went to Point Arguello near Santa Barbara to locate the wreck of the three-masted steamship SS Yankee Blade looking for gold. He was able to raise four boxes of treasure from the sunken vessel, which amounted to $70,000.

== End of service ==
On May 7, 1857, the Dancing Feather went ashore in thick fog, on the beach north of Point Bonita in San Francisco Bay, California. The pilots and crew were able to escape to the shore. The tugboat Martin White tried to save the pilot boat but she was a total loss. She was insured and worth about 10,000.

== See also ==
- List of Northeastern U. S. Pilot Boats
