= Daniel Webster (pilot boat) =

Boston Pilot boat

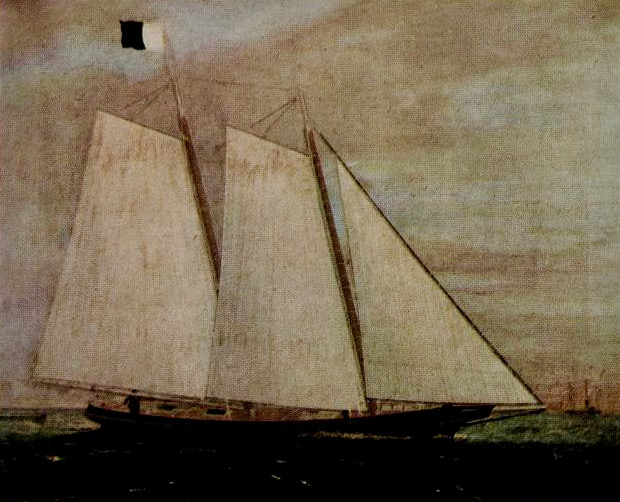
- Oil painting of the pilot boat Daniel Webster.

History

United States
- Name: Daniel Webster
- Namesake: Daniel Webster, American lawyer and statesman
- Operator: William Robinson Lampee
- Launched: 1851
- Out of service: 1892
- Fate: Sank

General characteristics
- Class & type: schooner
- Tonnage: 77-tons TM
- Propulsion: Sail

The Daniel Webster was a 19th-century pilot boat, built in 1851 at Chelsea, Massachusetts. She was sold to the San Francisco Pilots' Opposition Line in October 1853. In 1864 she sailed for Shanghai, China to be in the pilot service. She operated in Shanghai until 1892 when she was lost in a storm.

== Construction and service ==
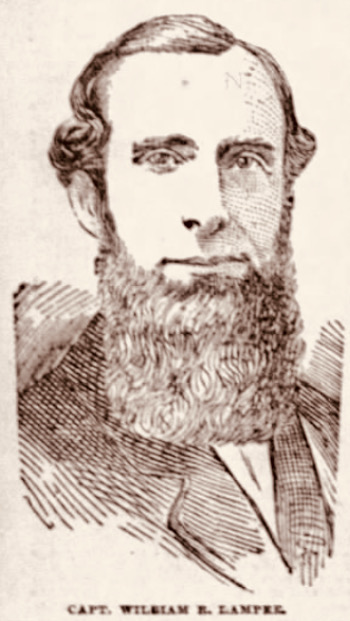
Captain William R. Lampee.

The Boston pilot-boat Daniel Webster, was built in 1851 at Chelsea, Massachusetts. Captain William R. Lampee as a maritime pilot and Thomas Cooper as an apprentice served on the Webster in the Boston pilot service. She was named for Daniel Webster, an American lawyer and statesman. When Webster died on 24 October 1852, the pilots of the Daniel Webster, wanted to attend his funeral. However, when they sailed to Marshfield, Massachusetts, they could not come ashore because there was not enough wind to pilot the boat near the shore.

After losing the Dennison J. Lawlor Boston built pilot-boat Dancing Feather, in 1853 to the newly established San Francisco Merchant Line, the Daniel Webster, was purchased by the San Francisco Pilots' Old Line in October 1853. The Daniel Webster sailed from Boston to Cape Horn to get to San Francisco. The company was composed of W. W. Neal, C. L. Abbot, D. Murphy, W. E. Dornette, and O. E. Sampson. The Daniel Webster, served the San Francisco fleet until 1862 when she was replaced by the Boston pilot-boat Caleb Curtis.

The Daniel Webster, left San Francisco in February 1863 and sailed for Shanghai, China to become a pilot-boat. Her owners were Shelby, Palmer, Reddish, and C. L. Abbott, all San Francisco pilots, who went with her to be used a pilot-boat there. Captain N. L. Rogers took the Daniel Webster to Shanghai as the sailing master. She operated in Shanghai until 1892.

== End of service ==
Pilot-boat Daniel Webster, operated until 1892 in Shanghai, when she was lost in a storm. All pilots were rescued.

== See also ==
- List of Northeastern U. S. Pilot Boats
