= Caleb Curtis =

Boston and San Francisco 19th-century pilot boat

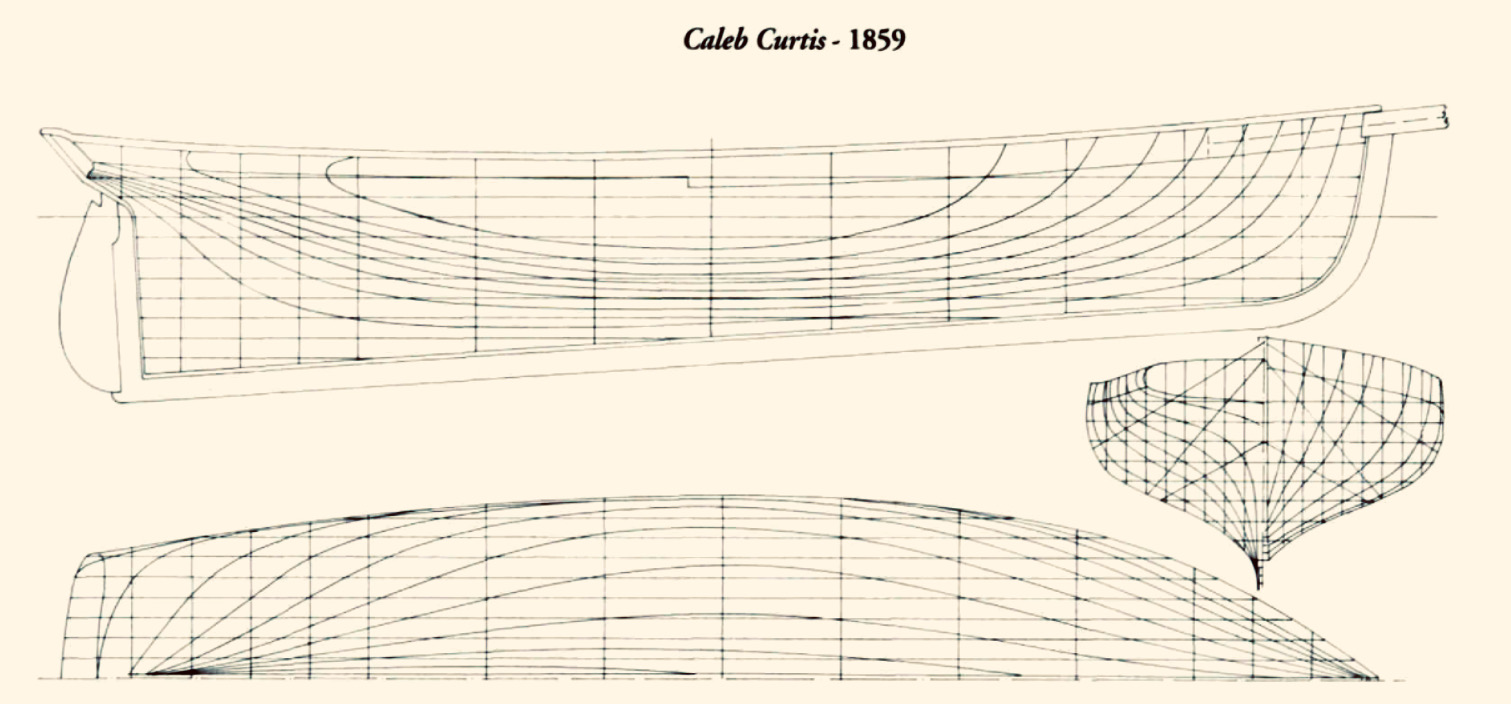
- Pilot boat Caleb Curtis, c. 1859

History

United States
- Name: Caleb Curtis
- Namesake: Caleb Curtis, Boston pilot commissioner
- Owner: Boston and San Francisco Pilots
- Operator: John Callahan, Joseph Simmons, Aurelius A. Buckingham, Henry Van Ness, John F. Schander, Alex Swanson, Captain Boyd and Captain Neale
- Launched: 1859
- Out of service: May 29, 1892
- Fate: Sank

General characteristics
- Class & type: Schooner
- Tonnage: 80-tons TM
- Length: 90 ft 0 in (27.43 m)
- Propulsion: Sail

The Caleb Curtis was a 19th-century two-masted Boston pilot boat, built in 1859 at Chelsea, Massachusetts for Boston maritime pilots. She well known for her speed. the Curtis was sold to the San Francisco Pilots' Opposition Line in October 1861 and sailed from Boston around Cape Horn and then to San Francisco to become a pilot boat with the San Francisco fleet. She was shipwrecked inside the Bonita Channel in 1867. The Caleb Curtis was repaired, and was able to continue as a pilot boat in San Francisco from 1867 to 1892. She was sold at auction 1892. From 1892 to 1899, she had different owners and sailed the waters of Japan, Socorro Island, Clipperton Island and Tahiti, Hong Kong and Klondike, Yukon. She was shipwrecked at Cape Nome, Alaska in 1899.

== Construction and service ==
The Caleb Curtis was a Boston pilot-boat built in 1859 at Chelsea, Massachusetts for Boston pilots. She served two years in the Boston service before being sold to the San Francisco Pilots' Opposition Line in October 1861. She replaced the pilot boat Daniel Webster, that served the San Francisco fleet until 1862 when she was driven ashore.

The Curtis was 80-tons and well known for her speed. She sailed from Boston around Cape Horn and then to San Francisco in January 1862.

The Curtis was wrecked inside the shipping Bonita Channel outside Golden Gate Bridge on April 11, 1867, attempting to cross the bar on her way to relieve the pilot boat J. C. Cousins. Three pilots and four men were drowned, which made it the single most costly casualty in the history of San Francisco piloting. The cutter Wyanda towed her into San Francisco. The crew that were lost: John Callahan, Joseph Simmons, and pilots Aurelius A. Buckingham, Henry Van Ness, and John F. Schander. Captain Alex Swanson, Captain Boyd and Captain Neale survived the accident and Swanson later told the story to the San Francisco Examiner. He said: "We left port for the bar station in the pilot-boat Celeb Curtis. Just over the bar we encountered a heavy norwester' and were blown down past the Seal rocks in a hurry... The sea washed me off, and when I came to the surface the Curtis was thirty feet away... Captain Boyd had the yawl over the side in about fifteen seconds, and was pulling in my direction regardless of the Curtis' fate." The pilot boat George Peabody, No. 3, was a replacement for the Caleb Curtis, after she was wrecked.

The Caleb Curtis was repaired, and was able to continue as a pilot boat. On October 3, 1867, the Curtis put a pilot aboard the clipper Andrew Jackson as she entered the Golden Gate. From 1867 to 1892, she continued as a San Francisco pilot boat. In 1869, after the consolidation of the pilot service, Boston built pilot-boat George F. Peabody, No. 3, joined the Caleb Curtis in the pilot service. The Peabody was the last of the Boston built pilot boats brought to San Francisco, which marked the end of an era of Boston piloting in San Francisco.

== End of service ==
Then, on May 29, 1892, the pilot boat Caleb Curtis was sold at auction in the Merchants' Exchange for $925 to Lawrence Ford, who turned her into a boat for hunting seals. She was replaced by a new schooner Bonita. On September 25, 1892, ex-pilot boat Caleb Curtis she sailed into San Francisco Bay after completing a voyage to the Socorro Island, Clipperton Island and Tahiti with Captain Remnier and his crew.

On July 22, 1893, the Caleb Curtis was purchased by Captain Brock who paid $2,000 for her. He was the captain and supercargo of the merchant boat and planned a trip to Tahiti and the south sea islands. On November 8, 1894, the Caleb Curtis was sunk during a typhoon in Hong Kong harbor. Captain Brock, his wife and the crew escaped and the Curtis was floated.

By May 23, 1897, the Curtis was sold and classified as a yacht sailing waters in Hong Kong. On August 25, 1898, the Caleb Curtis was in San Francisco and was on her way to Alaska with a party of gold hunters from Hong Kong. Captain Whittier purchased the Curtis for a voyage to Klondike, Yukon.

On October 18, 1899, the Caleb Curtis went ashore at Cape Nome, Alaska and was a total wreck. She was among the other Klondike Gold Rush hunters in the Seward Peninsula.

In the 1930s, a half-model was made by G. W. Ekelund, that showed the Curtis's curved forefoot, and long straight keel and vertical stern.

== See also ==
- List of Northeastern U.S. pilot boats
