= David Coulter (banker) =

American businessman

David A. Coulter is an American banker. He was chairman and CEO of Bank of America Corporation and Bank of America NT&SA from May 1996 to October 1998. In 2026, he remained a limited partner at Warburg Pincus.

== Early life and education ==
David A. Coulter is from Ford City, Pennsylvania, and graduated Ford City High School in 1965. He graduated Tepper School at Carnegie Mellon University in 1971 and received a BS and MS degree from Carnegie Mellon.

== Career ==
=== Bank of America ===
From 1976 to 1998, he worked at Bank of America. He was chairman and chief executive officer of Bank of America Corporation and Bank of America NT&SA from May 1996 to October 1998. According to American Banker, he left Bank of America after he agreed to a $62 billion acquisition by NationsBank in 1998, and was not chosen to succeed Hugh McColl as CEO of the merged bank as planned.

=== Beacon and JP Morgan Chase ===
Afterwards, he joined The Beacon Group, and was a partner in the Beacon Group, L.P. (investment banking firm) from January 2000 to July 2000. Prior to the merger with J.P. Morgan & Co. Incorporated, he was vice chairman of The Chase Manhattan Corporation (bank holding company) from August 2000 to December 2000.

JP Morgan Chase acquired The Beacon Group in July 2000, with Coulter joining JP Morgan Chase in the process. He was vice chairman of JPMorgan Chase & Co. (financial services and retail banking) from January 2001 to September 2005. He was vice chairman and head of investment banking at JP Morgan, and retired as vice chairman in September 2005.

He has been on the Federal Reserve Advisory Council and a member of the International Monetary Conference.

He was elected to the board of First Data Corp in 2006.

=== Warburg Pincus ===
He was hired by Warburg Pincus in January 2006. He managed Warburg Pincus' financial services practice from 2005 to 2014.

In July 2009, as Warburg Pincus managing director, he joined the board of Webster Financial after Warburg Pincus acquired a majority stake in Webster for $115 million.

In 2009, he remained a co-head of Warburg Pincus' financial services group, and oversaw the purchase of a majority stake in Triton Container International from the Pritzer family. In 2010, he began representing Warburg Pincus on the board of Sterling Financial.

Currently he is managing director and senior advisor of Warburg Pincus, a global private equity firm.

== Boards ==
Coulter has been a director of PG&E Corporation and Pacific Gas and Electric Company since 1996. He also is a director of Metavante Technologies and Strayer Education, Inc.

After joining in 1997 and becoming chair in July 2021, as of 2026, he remained on the board of trustees at Carnegie Mellon University.

He is on the boards of Varo Money, ModivCare, and Innovu, the Lincoln Center, Asia Society of Northern California, and the American Prairie Reserve.

In April 2021, he was announced as the Chair of the Board of Trustees of Carnegie Mellon.

== Personal life ==
He and his wife Susan Weeks Coulter are residents of San Francisco and New York City.
