= Aroma lamp =

Essential oil diffuser

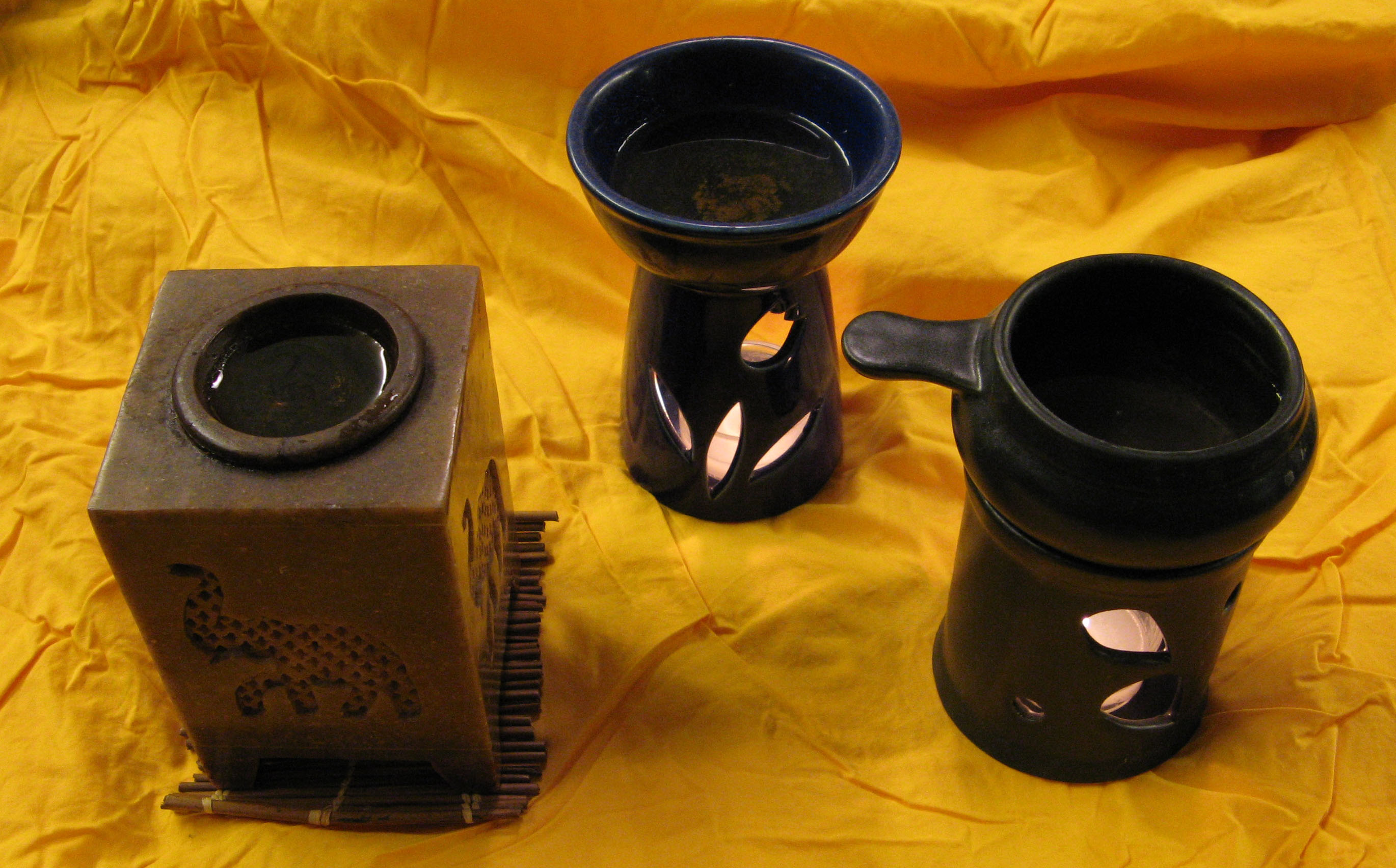
Various aroma lamps

Aroma lamps, or diffusers, are used to diffuse essential oils. They may project the oil into the air by heating it, letting it evaporate naturally, or nebulizing it using compressed air or ultrasonics.

== Evaporative diffuser ==
An evaporative diffuser is a device that uses a pad, filter, or reeds to diffuse the essential oils. One of the disadvantages of this tool is that the light elements of the essential oils will be circulated around the ceiling first and will only come down at the end of the process.

== Heat diffuser ==
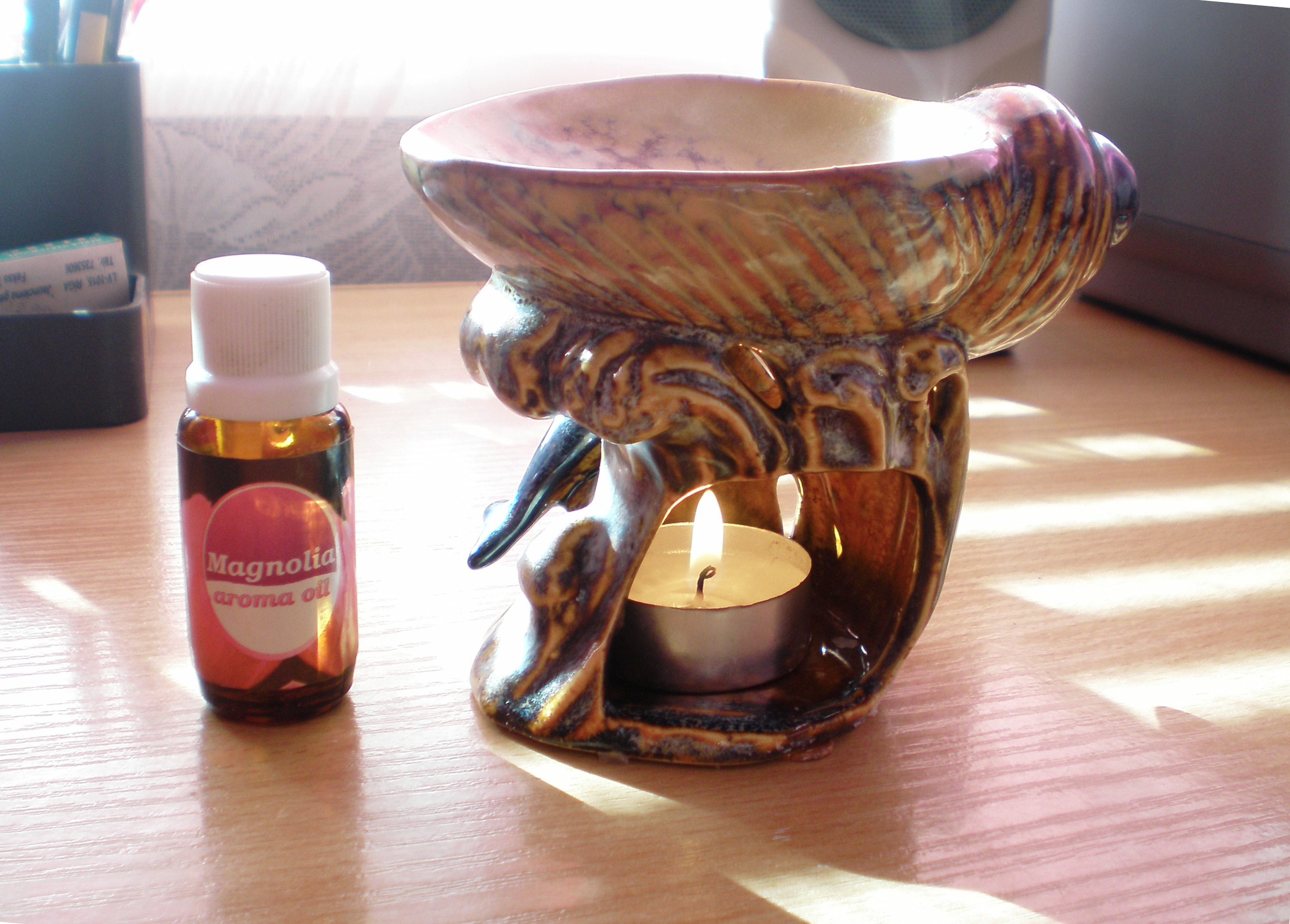
Aroma lamp with essential oil

A heat diffuser contains a small candle under a bowl to vaporize a mixture of water and oil. This device is very cheap and doesn't need a special maintenance, however, the heat can change the chemical structure of the oils.

Certain plug-in nightlight units made by companies such as Air Wick are used in combination with glass bulbs of scented oil, filling a room with fragrance and light.

== Nebulizer ==
A nebulizer is a device that does not use water or heat as other diffusers. Instead the bottle of essential oil is attached directly to the nebulizer and an air current is forced through a nozzle across a tube carrying the liquid to be nebulized, which is dispersed into small particles and emitted by the Bernoulli effect. As a result, the unit uses 100% pure essential oil. The benefit of using this device is a strong concentration of the essential oil. However, it can be noisier than the other devices depending on the specific model in use.

== Ultrasonic diffuser ==
An ultrasonic diffuser has a small plate submerged in water at room temperature with a few drops of essential oil, vibrating at ultrasonic frequency and thereby dispersing microscopic particles into the air, in a less concentrated way than a nebulizer. As water is used, the device also humidifies. These diffusers contain an ultrasonic transducer which vaporizes the water/oil mixture through cavitation and creates instantaneous vapor.

== See also ==
- Aromatherapy
- Censer
