= ModivCare =

American social services corporation

Modivcare Inc.
- Company type: Public
- Traded as: Nasdaq: MODV
- Industry: Healthcare
- Founded: 1996; 30 years ago
- Headquarters: Denver, Colorado, U.S.
- Key people: Leslie V. Norwalk (chair); L. Heath Sampson (CEO)
- Services: Non-emergency medical transportation; Personal care; Remote patient monitoring
- Revenue: ▲US$ 2,788 million (2024)
- Operating income: ▲US$ −93 million (2024)
- Net income: ▲US$ −201 million (2024)
- Total assets: ▼US$ 1,654 million (2024)
- Total equity: ▼US$ −38 million (2024)
- Number of employees: 23,675 (2024)
- Website: modivcare.com

Modivcare Inc. is an American social services corporation based in Denver, Colorado, primarily providing non-emergency medical transportation for Medicaid recipients nationwide. In August 2025, Modivcare began a financial restructuring process with a Chapter 11 bankruptcy filing.

== Overview ==
Modivcare, known until 2021 as Providence Service Corporation with its principal subsidiary LogistiCare, was established in 1996. The company's common stock began trading publicly in 2003. Modivcare had a payroll of approximately 23,675 at the end of 2024, after a long series of corporate acquisitions. The bulk of the company's revenue and income arise from being the largest contractual provider of non-emergency medical transportation in the United States. Modivcare arranges millions of rides per month, primarily for Medicaid recipients who need assistance getting to and from medical appointments. In 2020–2021, the company acquired additional business lines providing in-home assistance and monitoring.

Modivcare has been widely criticized for poor transportation service that leaves medical patients stranded. A state audit estimated that more than 40% of customers submitted complaints in a five-month period (mostly for "no-show incidents") although the company consistently reported less than 1% per month.

After Modivcare's bankruptcy filing in August 2025, its common stock was suspended from NASDAQ trading and then delisted.
