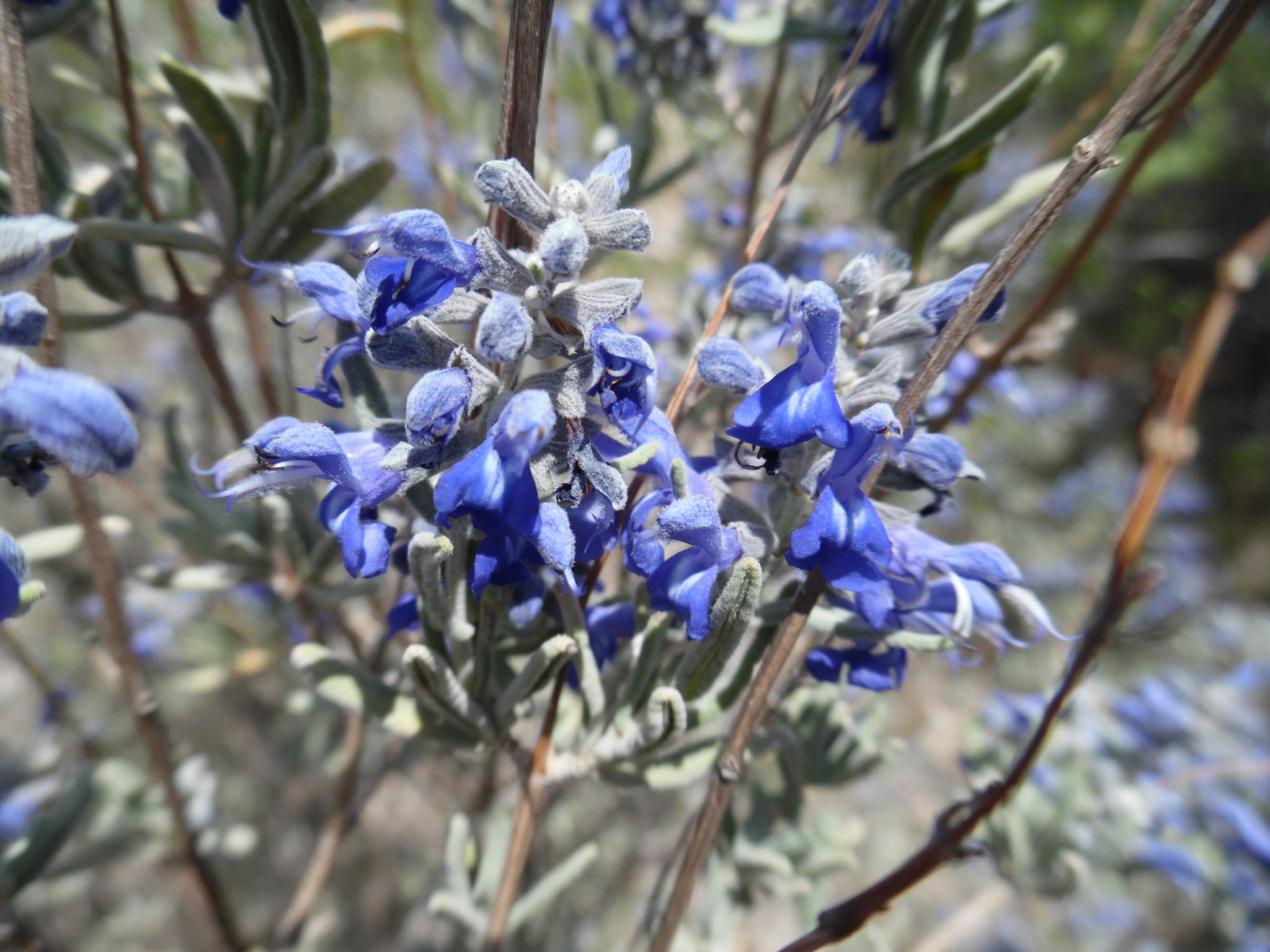

Scientific classification
- Kingdom: Plantae
- Clade: Tracheophytes
- Clade: Angiosperms
- Clade: Eudicots
- Clade: Asterids
- Order: Lamiales
- Family: Lamiaceae
- Genus: Salvia
- Species: S. coulteri

Binomial name
- Salvia coulteri Fernald

= Salvia coulteri =

Species of shrub

Salvia coulteri (Coulter's sage) is a perennial shrub that grows on dry rocky mountainsides in five Mexican states: Nuevo León, Zacatecas, Tamaulipas, Durango, and Hidalgo. It was introduced to horticulture in 1991 from a plant collected at 4,000 feet (1,200 m) in Nuevo León.

It grows about 2.5 ft tall and 3 ft wide, with many stems and a graceful appearance. The small (0.5 in) electric lavender-blue flowers grow in tight whorls and bloom profusely. Even though it flowers are in whorls, the calyces are all on one side, causing the flowers to sweep to one side. The calyces persist long after the flowers drop, and have a mint-like fragrance when rubbed.
