= William A. Coulter =

American painter

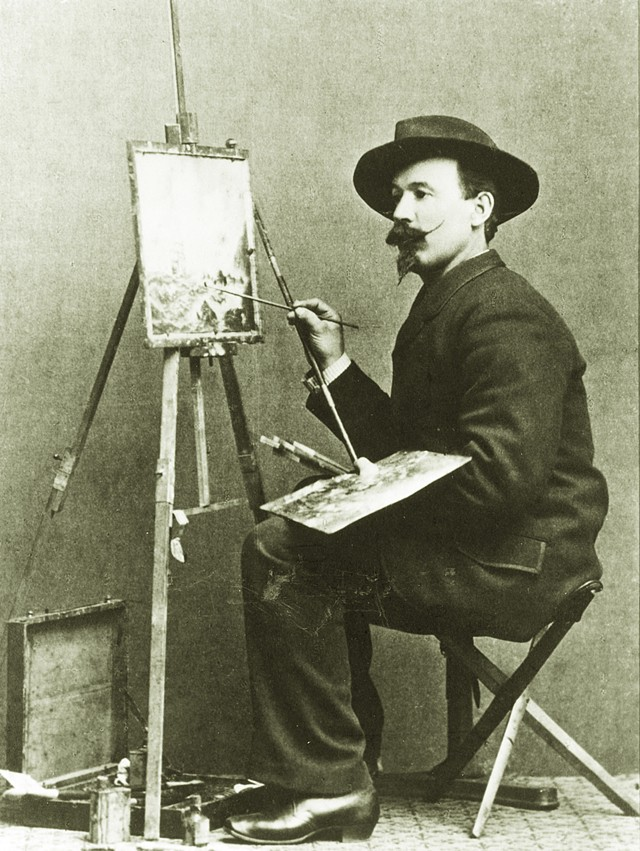
- William A. Coulter as a young man.
- Born: March 7, 1849; Glenariff, County Antrim, Northern Ireland
- Died: March 13, 1936 (aged 87); Sausalito, California, US
- Occupation: painter
- Spouse: Harriet Angela Hostetter
- Children: 3

William A. Coulter, born William Alexander Coulter (March 7, 1849 – March 13, 1936), was an Irish-born American painter of marine subjects. Coulter was a native of Glenariff, County Antrim, in what is today Northern Ireland. He became an apprentice seaman at the age of 13, and after seven years at sea, came to settle in San Francisco in 1869.

== Career ==
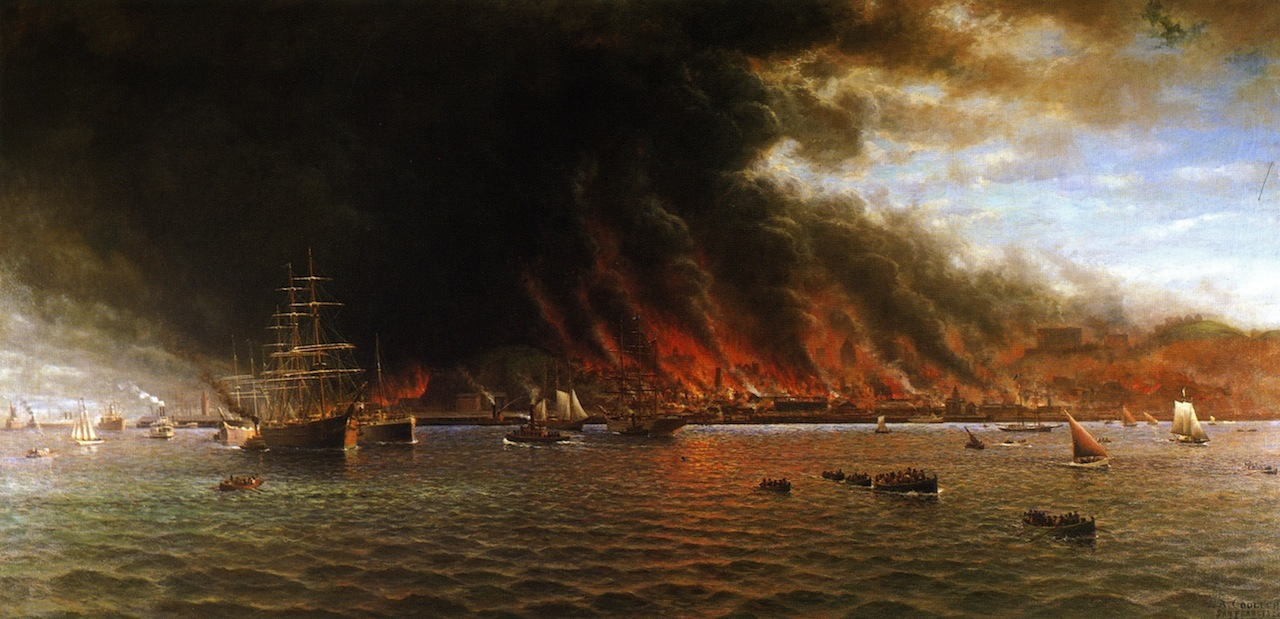
Coulter's San Francisco Fire, 1906

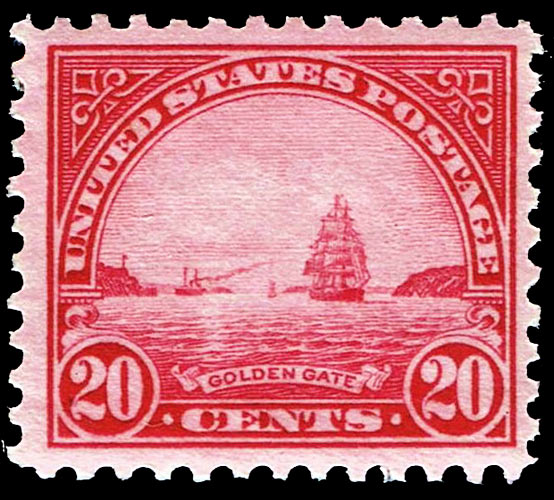
20 cent, 1923 US postage stamp of Golden Gate, based on painting by William Alexander Coulter

In the late 1870s, he went to Europe to study with marine artists Vilhelm Melbye, François Musin, and J. C. Jacobsen. In 1896, he joined the art staff of the San Francisco Call.

Between 1909 and 1920, he painted five 16-by-18-foot murals for the Assembly Room of the Merchants Exchange Building.

During the course of his life, his paintings chronicled the history of shipping and navigation in the San Francisco and San Pablo bays.

== Death ==
Coulter resided in the San Francisco Bay Area until his death on March 13, 1936, at the age of 87, in his Sausalito home. Funeral services were held at the Robert F. Russell Mortuary in Mill Valley.

== Legacy ==
William A. Coulter's most famous work was his San Francisco Fire, 1906. The SS William A. Coulter was a Liberty ship which was constructed and deployed in 1943, and named in his honor.

In 1923, the United States Post Office issued a commemorative 20-cent stamp with one of Coulter's paintings. The Hawaii State Art Museum, the Honolulu Museum of Art, the Oakland Museum of California, the Orange County Museum of Art (Newport Beach, CA), and the U.S. Navy Museum (Washington, DC) are among the public collections holding work by William A. Coulter.
