= Shoes.com =

Online footwear retailer

- Formerly: Shoebuy.com (2000-2017)
- Company type: Private
- Industry: E-commerce
- Founded: 1999; 27 years ago
- Headquarters: Boston, Massachusetts
- Products: Footwear (shoes, boots, slippers, sandals)
- Owner: IAC (2006–2016); Walmart (2016–2020); CriticalPoint Capital (2020–2022); Designer Brands, Inc. (2022–present)
- Number of employees: 200+ (2017)
- Parent: CriticalPoint Capital
- Website: shoes.com

Shoes.com (previously known as ShoeBuy.com) is an American footwear retailer. The website was established in Boston during 1999. In 2006, the company was acquired by IAC. In December 2016, Jet.com (a subsidiary of Walmart) completed the acquisition of ShoeBuy from IAC. It was reported that Walmart paid US$70 million for the company. As of 2017, Shoes.com contains over one million products, many which can also be purchased on Jet.com. ShoeBuy was re-branded as Shoes.com shortly after the acquisition closed.

In October 2020, Walmart sold Shoes.com to CriticalPoint Capital, a private equity firm, for an undisclosed amount.

During the second quarter of 2022, Designer Brands, Inc. acquired shoes.com.
