= Bonita Channel =

The Bonita Channel is a shipping channel which leads northbound traffic out of the Golden Gate to the Gulf of the Farallones and Pacific Ocean.

37.829928°N 122.559143°W
