= Aldehyde-stabilized cryopreservation =

Aldehyde-stabilized cryopreservation is a new technique for cryopreservation first demonstrated in 2016 by Robert L. McIntyre and Gregory Fahy at the cryobiology research company 21st Century Medicine, Inc. This technique uses a particular implementation of fixation and vitrification that can successfully preserve a rabbit brain in "near perfect" condition at −135 °C, with the cell membranes, synapses, and intracellular structures intact in electron micrographs. In 2016, McIntyre and Fahy were awarded the first portion of the Brain Preservation Technology Prize, the Small Animal Brain Preservation Prize, by the Brain Preservation Foundation for the successful cryopreservation of a whole mouse brain. The cryopreserved brain was rewarmed and no serious degradation was found to have occurred; the brain structure under electron microscopic evaluation after rewarming remained well-preserved. Although this technique has not yet led to a successful revival of a cryopreserved brain, some researchers see this technique as providing promising directions for future research.

== See also ==
- Cryonics
