= Cryonics – Freeze Me =

2006 television documentary

Cryonics – Freeze Me (originally titled Death in the Deep Freeze) is a television documentary programme created by ZigZag Production for Five in 2006 for in their Stranger than Fiction series. The program's main topic is cryonics and mainly features interviews with Alcor Life Extension Foundation staff or Alcor members. The documentary is narrated by Michael Lumsden and directed by Virginia Quinn. It shows how Anita Riskin, who has a terminal illness and dies, gets frozen.

Interviews with the following people are featured (in order of appearance):

- Tanya Jones, Chief Operating Officer, Alcor
- Michael Riskin, Ph.D., Alcor Board of Directors and Member
- Anita Riskin, Alcor Member
- Dr Arthur W. Rowe, Ph.D., Professor of Forensic Medicine, New York University Medical School
- Terry Katz, Alcor Member
- Aubrey de Grey, Ph.D., Biomedical Gerontologist
- Gregory Fahy, Ph.D. Vice President and Chief Scientific Officer, 21st Century Medicine
- Regina Pancake, Head of Alcor Stabilisation Team, South California
- Tilly Nydes
- Robin Nydes, Alcor Member
- Professor Ralph Merkle, Ph.D., Georgia Tech College of Computing
- Dr James R. Baker MD, Director Michigan Nanotechnology Institute

The Alcor Life Extension Foundation was the setting of some scenes in the documentary.

== Reception ==
Louisa Pearson of The Scotsman said Death in the Deep Freeze had "gut-wrenchingly explicit medical procedures" and was "a fascinating programme". Martin James, Sally Kinnes, Sarah Dempster called it "an absorbing film that follows the transition of a human being from corpse to orange ice block in liquid nitrogen". Scotland on Sunday reviewer found the show to be "part car-crash TV and part fascinating insight into a scientific phenomenon".

== See also ==
- Gerontology
- Cryobiology
- Life extension
