= Cryopreservation of testicular tissue =

Cryopreservation of testicular tissue is an experimental method being used to preserve fertility in pre-pubescent males, or males who cannot produce sperm, to allow them the option of having biological children.

Current first line treatment for fertility maintenance in men undergoing treatment which damages testicular tissue is cryopreservation of sperm. In boys yet to start producing sperm this is not possible, so cryopreservation of testicular tissue has been proposed as alternative therapy. This method is still experimental and not widely clinically available, and how to restore fertility with cryopreserved tissue is unknown and experimental.

== Indications ==
One cause of infertility in males is the medical treatment used to treat cancer (chemotherapy or radiotherapy), as it can have a toxic effect on the sperm producing tissue in the testes. For prepubertal boys undergoing cancer treatment who haven't yet begun producing sperm, preservation of sperm itself is not an option. Instead, cryopreservation of testicular tissue prior to cancer treatment can be offered to preserve fertility. This is available in a limited number of research centres. Later in life, if the affected individual decides they want biological children, their tissue can be retrieved from a tissue bank.

Another cause of male infertility is Klinefelter syndrome. This is a chromosomal abnormality (XY individual with extra X chromosomes) which causes germ cell loss early in life. Current research suggests that cryopreserving testicular tissue for prepubertal individuals can have promising results for using the tissue to produce sperm later in life, but is less likely to be effective if the testicular tissue is taken from older individuals.

In the future, cryopreservation of testicular tissue has the potential to be used to help transgender women have children. Again, in a scenario where a transgender women begins transitioning before spermarche (the beginning of sperm production, on average at 13.5 years), sperm producing tissue can be preserved instead. The sperm produced from this tissue can be used in artificial fertilisation. However, there have been no pregnancies yet reported using this method.

== Procedure ==
For pre-pubertal boys undergoing chemotherapy, or any other treatment which may be significantly gonadotoxic, options to preserve fertility include cryopreservation of testicular tissue (TT). This procedure is ideally done before the commencement of any treatments to avoid mutagenic effects of this on the germ cells being preserved. These procedures are still experimental and clear guidelines on the restoring of fertility after cryopreservation of TT have yet to be published.

Testicular fragments are retrieved during surgery and immediately placed into a transport medium at 4 – 8 °C to reduce contamination. It is possible to freeze either whole tissue or cell suspensions from the TT extracted, although whole tissue preserves the ability to pursue both cell or tissue-based therapies in the future and is therefore more widely used. TT is then placed into cryotubes, most often containing sucrose; a non-penetrating cryoprotective agent (CPA). CPAs are added to increase membrane stability during the dehydration phase and reduce damage to the cell structure when cryopreserving tissue. Cryopreservation can either be done by slow freezing or vitrification.

=== Slow freezing and vitrification ===
Slow freezing allows the temperature of the cells and surrounding medium to be modified in a controlled way, maximising the dehydration of the cells before temperatures are reached which cause intracellular ice to form – this reduces the likelihood of damage from ice crystals. Vitrification freezes the tissue at an 'ultrafast' rate, using a higher concentration of CPAs to stabilise the tissue. This method allows fast cooling of the cells without mechanical disruption to the cell body.

== Current challenges ==
=== Procedure ===
There have been numerous challenges identified in cryopreserving testicular tissue many of which are due to very little tissue being available for research and the lack of long-term studies. Testicular biopsies for cryopreservation have been performed among many research centres leading to variation in procedure and optimal procedure is yet to be determined.

=== Transport ===
After the tissue for cryopreservation is biopsied it needs to be transported. The tissue must remain viable during this process. There are many important variables such as temperature, biopsy size, transport time and storage medium. All of these may affect the future viability of the tissue but there are currently no long-term studies or optimal guidelines.

=== Generation of Sperm ===
The purpose of cryopreserving testis tissue is to generate viable sperm. There have not yet been sperm generated using human cryopreserved testis tissue so we do not know if this would be successful. We have however generated functional sperm capable of fertilising oocytes using animal models including primates.

=== Malignant contamination ===
Contamination of the testicular tissue for cryopreservation by malignant cells is a concern. In a rodent model it has been shown that if malignant cells are present in the cryopreserved tissue, it can cause relapse of the malignancy transplanted into the host. There have been methods trialled to remove the malignant cells from the tissue, but these are still only experimental and not reliable.

=== Genetic stability ===
It is important to consider the genetic stability of the gametes which will be produced following the transplantation of the cryopreserved tissue. In mouse studies there have been some epigenetic changes observed which seem to be insignificant. In human culture, epigenetic changes in methylation status of several imprinted genes were observed but the significance of this has not yet been determined.

== Ethical considerations ==
Due to the nature of the cryopreservation of testicular tissue, ethical concerns must be eliminated before this technique can be used clinically. The experimental intervention in prepubertal boys lies a central concern with fertility preservation. Since children are involved a thorough consideration into the risks vs the benefits must be looked at. However, the lack of proven data on the efficacy of the technique raises questions of medical ethics. Additionally, structural and social ethical issues must be considered, such as the financial costs and accessibility of the procedure.

== Future applications ==
Spermatogonial stem cell (SSC) transplantation, in vitro spermatogenesis and testicular tissue grafting are three methods in development for the fertility restoration of cryopreserved testicular tissue. Firstly, SSC transplantation, the only technique to allow natural conception to happen involves isolating testicular cells from the cryopreserved tissue in an attempt to grow the SSC number These SSCs are then transplanting into the testis where they will carry out spermatogenesis, producing sperm continuously. Testicular tissue grafting, an alternative approach involves grafting fragments of testicular tissue to homotypic or ectopic locations. Lastly, in vitro spermatogenesis is an approach which could be used in patients with malignant haematological diseases to reduce the chance of reintroducing malignant cells back into the body, this requires more research into the experimental conditions.

== See also ==
- Tissue cryopreservation
- Ovarian tissue cryopreservation
