= Cold hardening =

Process by which an organism prepares for cold weather

Cold hardening is the physiological and biochemical process by which an organism prepares for cold weather.

== Plants ==
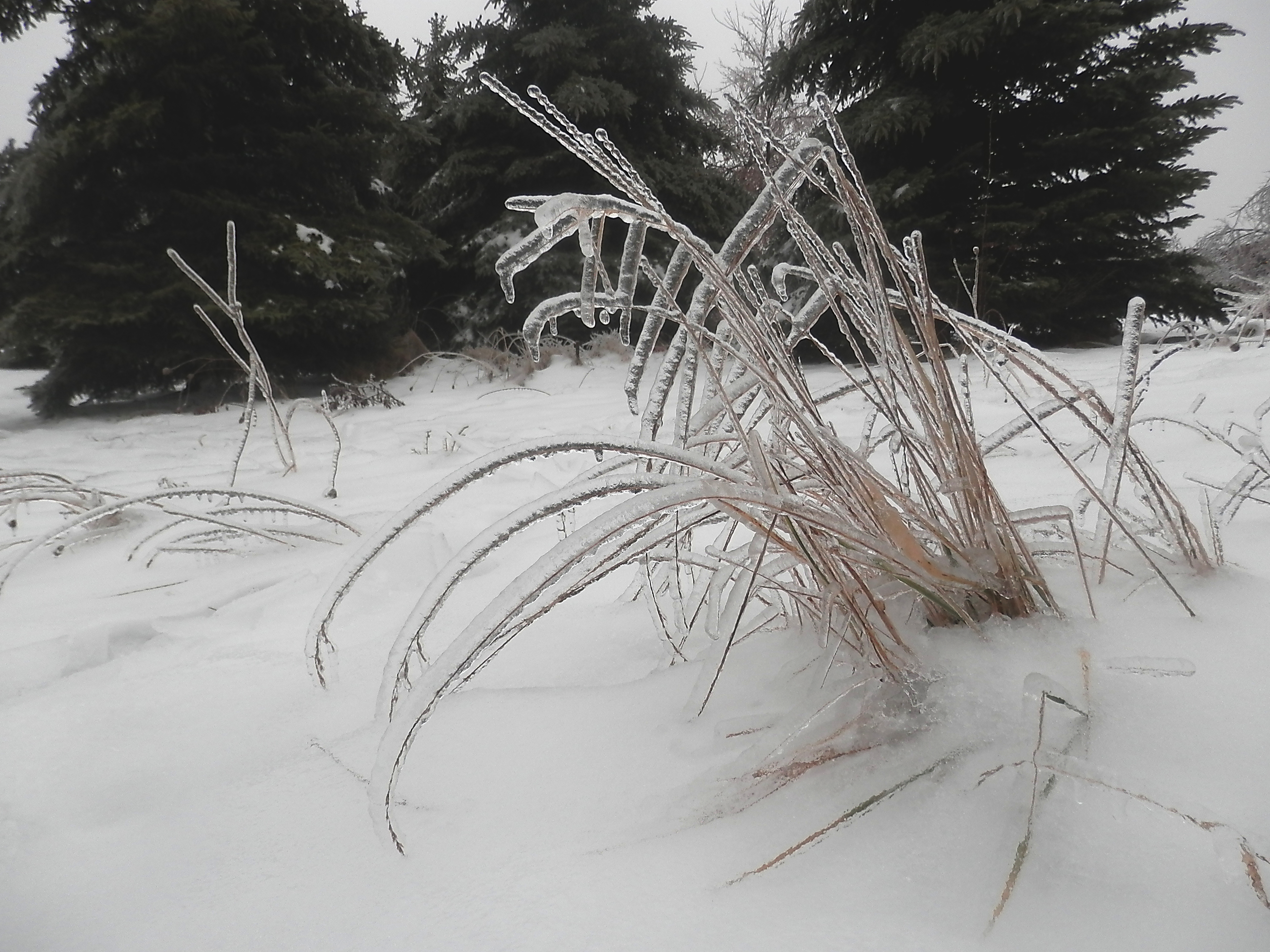
Plant covered in snow after an ice storm in 2013, Ontario, Canada

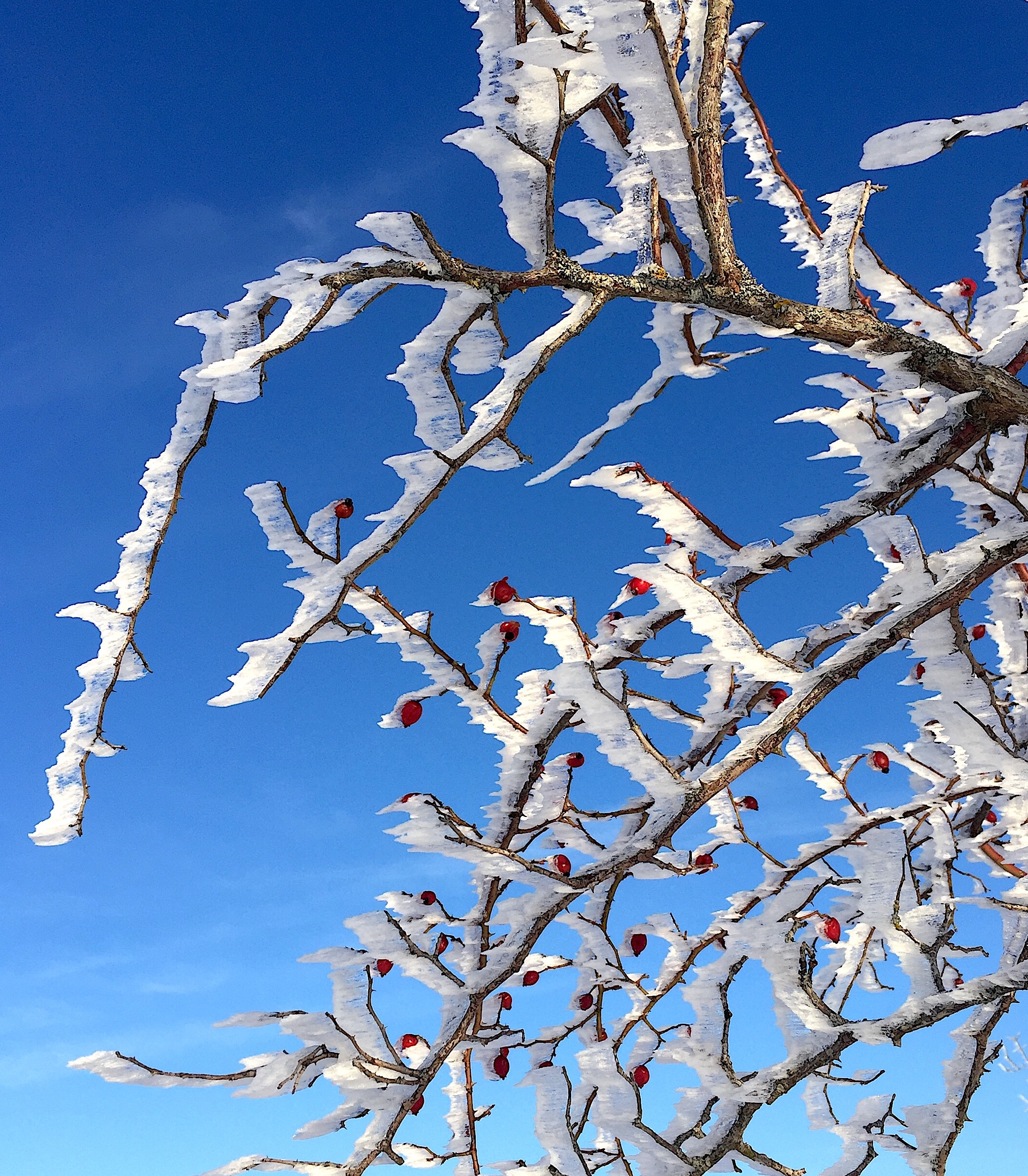
Rosa canina covered in frost, Swabian Jura

Plants in temperate and polar regions adapt to winter and sub zero temperatures by relocating nutrients from leaves and shoots to storage organs. Freezing temperatures induce dehydrative stress on plants, as water absorption in the root and water transport in the plant decreases. Water in and between cells in the plant freezes and expands, causing tissue damage. Cold hardening is a process in which a plant undergoes physiological changes to avoid, or mitigate cellular injuries caused by sub-zero temperatures. Non-acclimatized individuals can survive −5 °C, while an acclimatized individual in the same species can survive −30 °C. Plants that originated in the tropics, like tomato or maize, don't go through cold hardening and are unable to survive freezing temperatures. The plant starts the adaptation by exposure to cold yet still not freezing temperatures. The process can be divided into three steps. First the plant perceives low temperature, then converts the signal to activate or repress expression of appropriate genes. Finally, it uses these genes to combat the stress, caused by sub-zero temperatures, affecting its living cells. Many of the genes and responses to low temperature stress are shared with other abiotic stresses, like drought or salinity.

Schematic of typical plant cell

When temperature drops, the membrane fluidity, RNA and DNA stability, and enzyme activity change. These, in turn, affect transcription, translation, intermediate metabolism, and photosynthesis, leading to an energy imbalance. This energy imbalance is thought to be one of the ways the plant detects low temperature. Experiments on arabidopsis show that the plant detects the change in temperature, rather than the absolute temperature. The rate of temperature drop is directly connected to the magnitude of calcium influx, from the space between cells, into the cell. Calcium channels in the cell membrane detect the temperature drop, and promotes expression of low temperature responsible genes in alfalfa and arabidopsis. The response to the change in calcium elevation depends on the cell type and stress history. Shoot tissue will respond more than root cells, and a cell that already is adapted to cold stress will respond more than one that has not been through cold hardening before. Light doesn't control the onset of cold hardening directly, but shortening of daylight is associated with fall, and starts production of reactive oxygen species and excitation of photosystem 2, which influences low-temp signal transduction mechanisms. Plants with compromised perception of day length have compromised cold acclimation.

Cold increases cell membrane permeability and makes the cell shrink, as water is drawn out when ice is formed in the extracellular matrix between cells. To retain the surface area of the cell membrane so it will be able to regain its former volume when temperature rises again, the plant forms more and stronger Hechtian strands. These are tubelike structures that connect the protoplast with the cell wall. When the intracellular water freezes, the cell will expand, and without cold hardening the cell would rupture. To protect the cell membrane from expansion induced damage, the plant cell changes the proportions of almost all lipids in the cell membrane, and increases the amount of total soluble protein and other cryoprotecting molecules, like sugar and proline.

Chilling injury occurs at 0–10 degrees Celsius, as a result of membrane damage, metabolic changes, and toxic buildup. Symptoms include wilting, water soaking, necrosis, chlorosis, ion leakage, and decreased growth. Freezing injury may occur at temperatures below 0 degrees Celsius. Symptoms of extracellular freezing include structural damage, dehydration, and necrosis. If intracellular freezing occurs, it will lead to death. Freezing injury is a result of lost permeability, plasmolysis, and post-thaw cell bursting.

When spring comes, or during a mild spell in winter, plants de-harden, and if the temperature is warm for long enough – their growth resumes.

== Insects ==
Cold hardening has also been observed in insects such as the fruit fly and diamondback moth. These insects use rapid cold hardening to protect against cold shock during overwintering periods. Overwintering insects remain active through the winter while non-overwintering insects migrate or die. Rapid cold hardening can occur during short periods of undesirable temperatures. The buildup of cryoprotective compounds such as glycerol is one mechanism of cold hardening in insects. Glycerol interacts with other cell components in order to decrease the insect's permeability to the cold. When an insect is exposed to cold temperatures, glycerol rapidly accumulates. Glycerol is a non-ionic kosmotrope forming powerful hydrogen bonds with water molecules. The hydrogen bonds in the glycerol compound compete with the weaker bonds between the water molecules, interrupting ice crystal formation. This reaction between glycerol and water has been used as an antifreeze in the past. Proteins also play a large role in cold hardening. Glycogen phosphorylase (GlyP) is a key enzyme that increases in comparison to a control group not experiencing cold hardening. Once warmer temperatures are observed, the process of acclimation begins, and the increase in the concentrations of glycerol and other cryoprotective compounds is reversed. There is a rapid cold hardening capacity found within certain insects that suggests not all insects can survive a long period of overwintering. Non-diapausing insects can sustain brief temperature shocks but often have a limit to what they can handle before the body can no longer produce enough cryoprotective components.

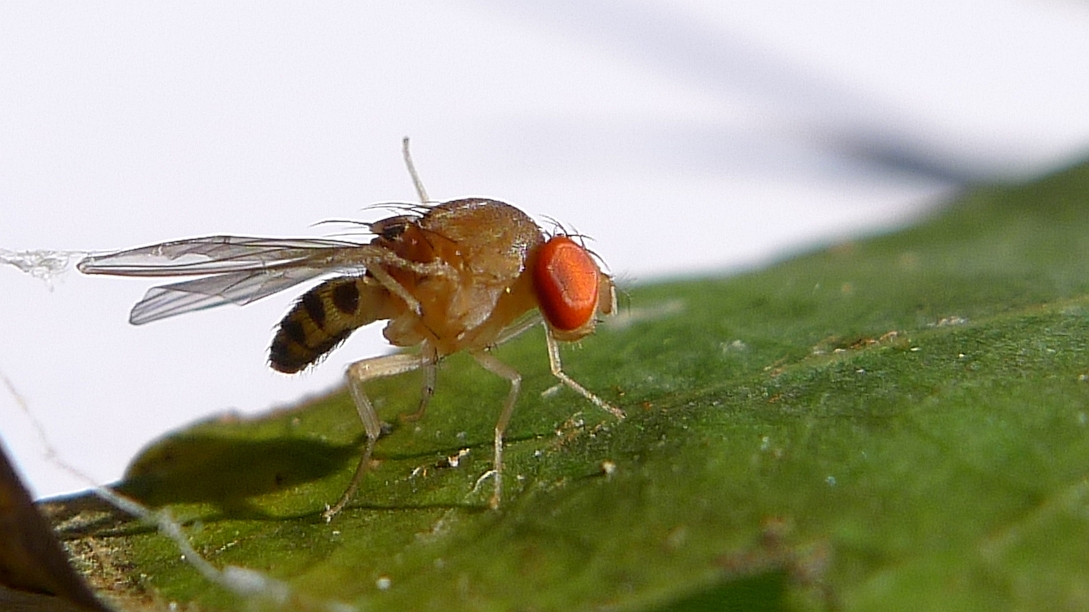
The common fruit fly

In addition to improving insects' survival during cold temperatures, cold hardening also improves the organism's performance. Rapid cold hardening (RCH), one of the fastest cold temperature responses recorded, allows an insect to quickly adapt to severe weather change without compromising function. Drosophila melanogaster (the common fruit fly) is a frequently experimented insect involving cold hardening. An example of RCH enhancing organisms' performance comes from courting and mating within the fruit fly. Fruit flies mate more frequently once RCH has commenced, compared to a control insect group not experiencing RCH. Most insects experiencing extended cold periods are observed to modify membrane lipids. Desaturation of fatty acids is the most commonly seen modification to the cell membrane. When fruit flies were observed under a stressful climate, the survival rate increased in comparison to the fly prior to cold hardening.

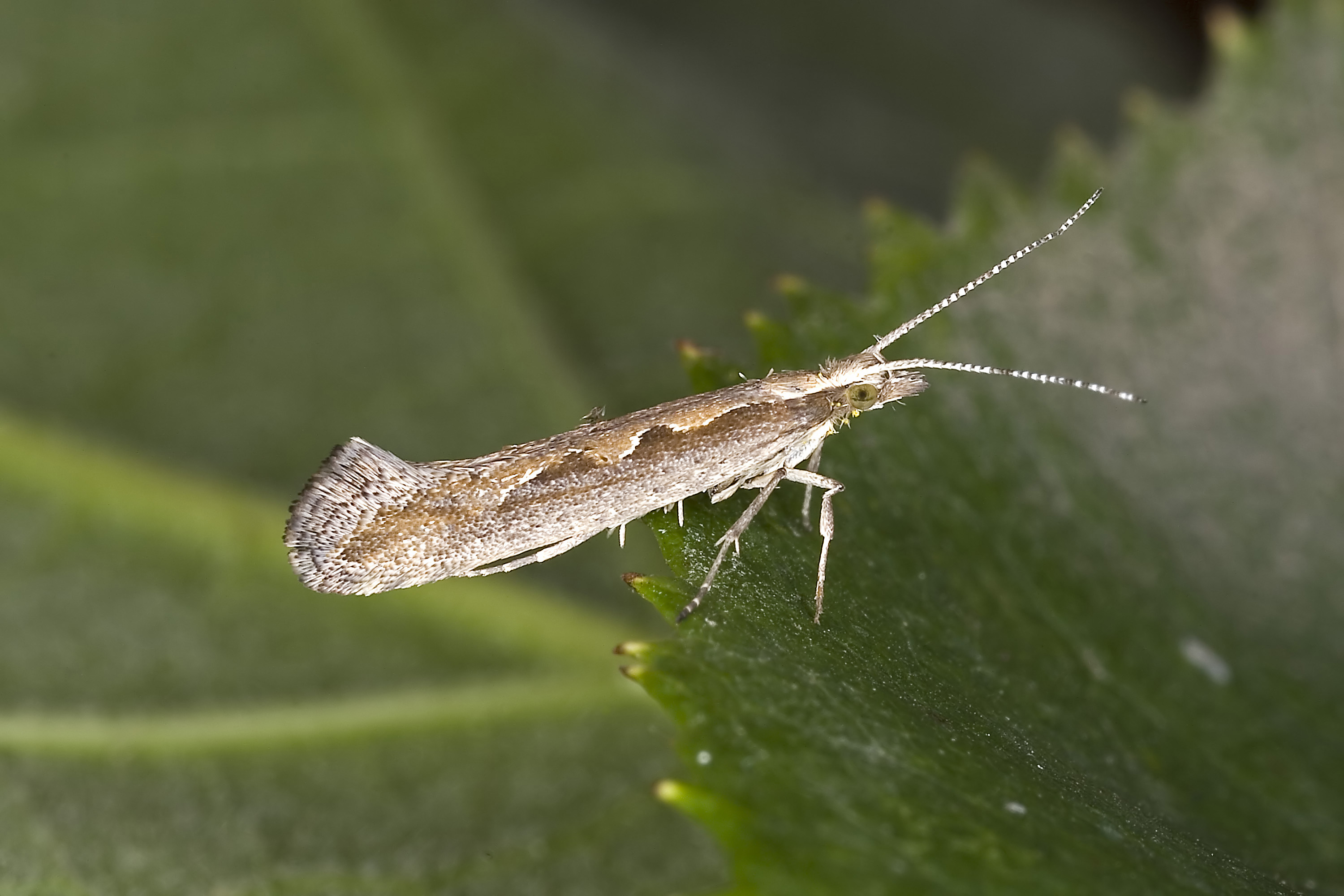
The diamondback moth

In addition to the common fruit fly, the cold-hardening response of Plutella xylostella (the diamondback moth) also has been widely studied. While this insect also shows an increase in glycerol and similar cryoprotective compounds, it also shows an increase in polyols. These compounds are specifically linked to cryoprotective compounds. The polyol compound is freeze-susceptible and freeze tolerant. Polyols simply act as a barrier within the insect body by preventing intracellular freezing by restricting the extracellular freezing likely to happen in overwintering periods. During the larval stage of the diamondback moth, the significance of glycerol was tested again for validity. The lab injected the larvae with added glycerol and in turn proved that glycerol is a major factor in survival rate when cold hardening. The cold tolerance is directly proportional to the buildup of glycerol during cold hardening.

Cold hardening of insects improves the survival rate of the species and improves function. Once environmental temperature begins to warm up above freezing, the cold hardening process is reversed and the concentrations of glycerol and cryoprotective compounds decrease within the body. This also reverts the function of the insect to pre-cold hardening activity.

== See also ==
- Antifreeze protein
- Cryobiology
- Cryopreservation
- Overwintering
- Hibernation
