= Cryostasis =

Cryostasis may refer to:

- Cryostasis (clathrate hydrates), the reversible cryopreservation of live biological objects
- Cryopreservation, process of cooling to low sub-zero temperatures
- Cryonics, experimental process of freezing a person for later resuscitation
  - Suspended animation in fiction, a common theme in science fiction
- Cryostasis: Sleep of Reason, a video game
