= Allison Hubel =

American mechanical engineer and cryobiologist

Allison Hubel is an American mechanical engineer and cryobiologist who applies her expertise in heat transfer to study the cryopreservation of biological tissue. She is a professor of mechanical engineering at the University of Minnesota, where she directs the Biopreservation Core Resource and the Technological Leadership Institute, and is the president of the Society for Cryobiology from 2024 to 2025.

== Education and career ==
Hubel majored in mechanical engineering at Iowa State University, graduating in 1983. She continued her studies at the Massachusetts Institute of Technology (MIT), where she earned a master's degree in 1989 and completed her Ph.D. in the same year.

She worked as a research fellow at Massachusetts General Hospital from 1989 to 1990, and as an instructor at MIT from 1990 to 1993, before moving to the University of Minnesota in 1993 as a research associate in the Department of Laboratory Medicine and Pathology. In 1996 she became an assistant professor in that department, and in 2002 she moved to the Department of Mechanical Engineering as an associate professor. She was promoted to full professor in 2009, and became director of the Biopreservation Core Resource in 2010.

With two of her students, she founded a spinoff company, BlueCube Bio (later renamed Evia Bio) to commercialize their technology for preserving cells in cell therapy. She continues to serve as chief scientific officer for Evia Bio.

She became president-elect of the Society for Cryobiology for the 2022–2023 term, and became president in the subsequent term.

== Book ==
Hubel is the author of the book Preservation of Cells: A Practical Manual (Wiley, 2017).

== Recognition ==
Hubel was elected as an ASME Fellow in 2008, and a Fellow of the American Institute for Medical and Biological Engineering in 2012. She was named a Cryofellow of the Society for Cryobiology in 2021.
