= Antifreeze (disambiguation) =

Antifreeze may refer to:

- Antifreeze, engine coolant or coolant additive
- Antifreeze, agent for de-icing outdoor surfaces

== See also ==
- Antifreeze protein
- Cryoprotectant
