= Cryomedicine =

Cryomedicine may refer to

- Cryobiology, the scientific discipline that studies the effect of low temperature on living things
- Cryotherapy, the use of low temperatures in medical therapy
- Cryosurgery, the use of extreme cold in surgery to destroy abnormal or diseased tissue
