= Cryobiology (journal) =

- Discipline: Cryobiology
- Language: English
- Edited by: D.M. Rawson

Publication details
- History: 1964-present
- Publisher: Elsevier
- Frequency: Bimonthly
- Impact factor: 2.050 (2017)

Standard abbreviations
- ISO 4: Cryobiology

Indexing
- CODEN: CRYBAS
- ISSN: 0011-2240 (print); 1090-2392 (web)
- LCCN: 65009853
- OCLC no.: 81214989

Links
- Journal homepage; Online archive

Cryobiology is a bimonthly peer-reviewed scientific journal covering cryobiology. It was established in 1964 and is published by Elsevier on behalf of the Society for Cryobiology, of which it is the official journal. The editor-in-chief is D.M. Rawson (University of Bedfordshire). According to the Journal Citation Reports, the journal has a 2017 impact factor of 2.050.
