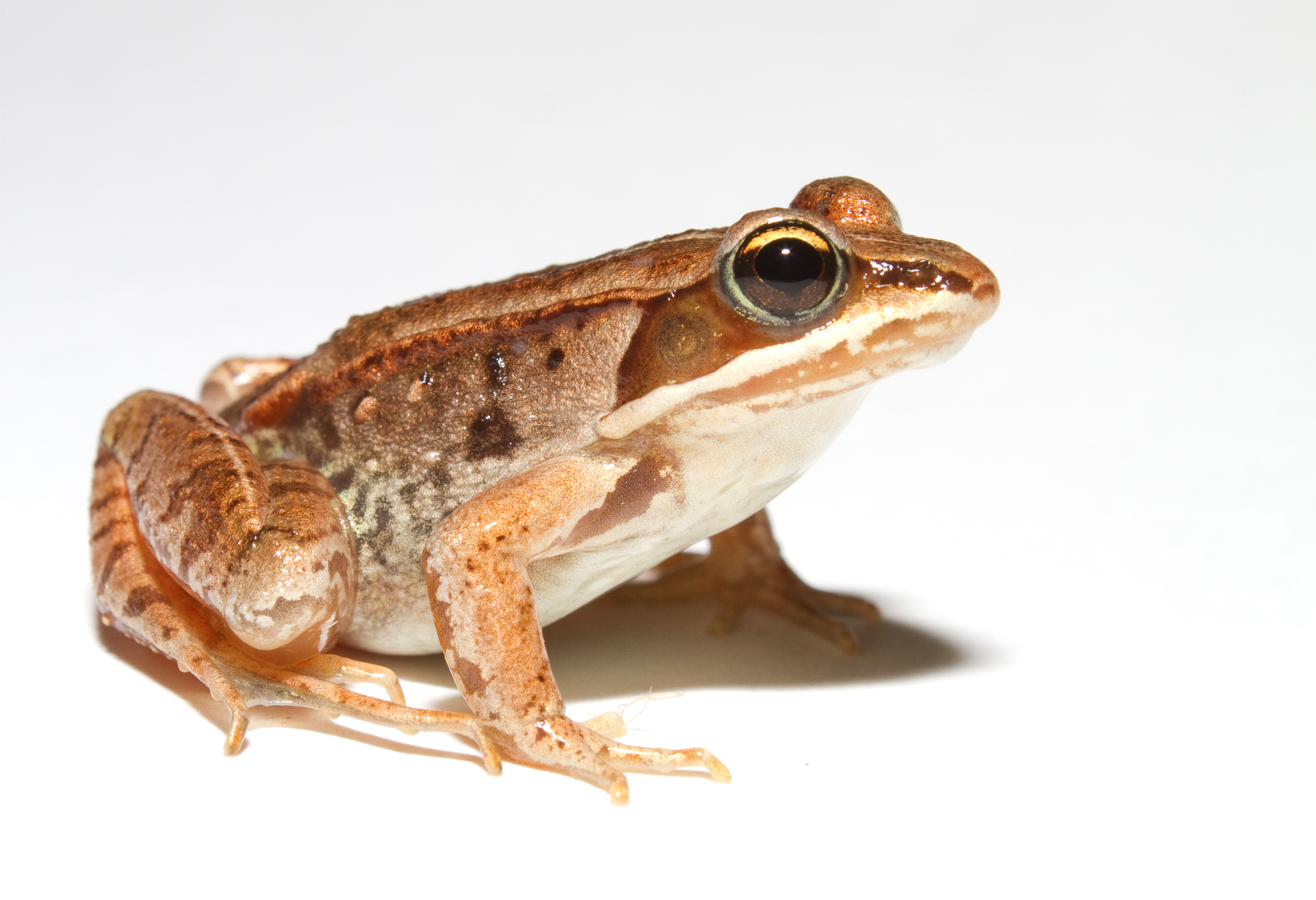

Conservation status
- Least Concern (IUCN 3.1)

- Secure (NatureServe)

Scientific classification
- Kingdom: Animalia
- Phylum: Chordata
- Class: Amphibia
- Order: Anura
- Family: Ranidae
- Genus: Lithobates
- Species: L. sylvaticus

Binomial name
- Lithobates sylvaticus (LeConte, 1825)
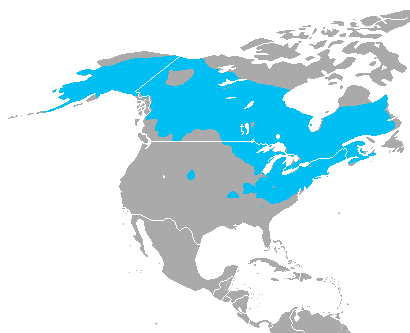
- Geographic range of the wood frog in North America (in blue)

Synonyms
- Rana sylvatica LeConte, 1825

= Wood frog =

Species of amphibian

Lithobates sylvaticus or Rana sylvatica, commonly known as the wood frog, is a frog species that has a broad distribution over North America, extending from the boreal forest of the north to the southern Appalachians, with several notable disjunct populations including lowland eastern North Carolina. The wood frog has garnered attention from biologists because of its freeze tolerance, relatively great degree of terrestrialism (for a ranid), interesting habitat associations (peat bogs, vernal pools, uplands), and relatively long-range movements. It is the only North American frog that occurs north of the Arctic Circle.

The ecology and conservation of the wood frog has attracted research attention in recent years because they are often considered "obligate" breeders in ephemeral wetlands (sometimes called "vernal pools"), which are themselves more imperiled than the species that breed in them. The wood frog has been proposed to be the official state amphibian of New York.

== Description ==
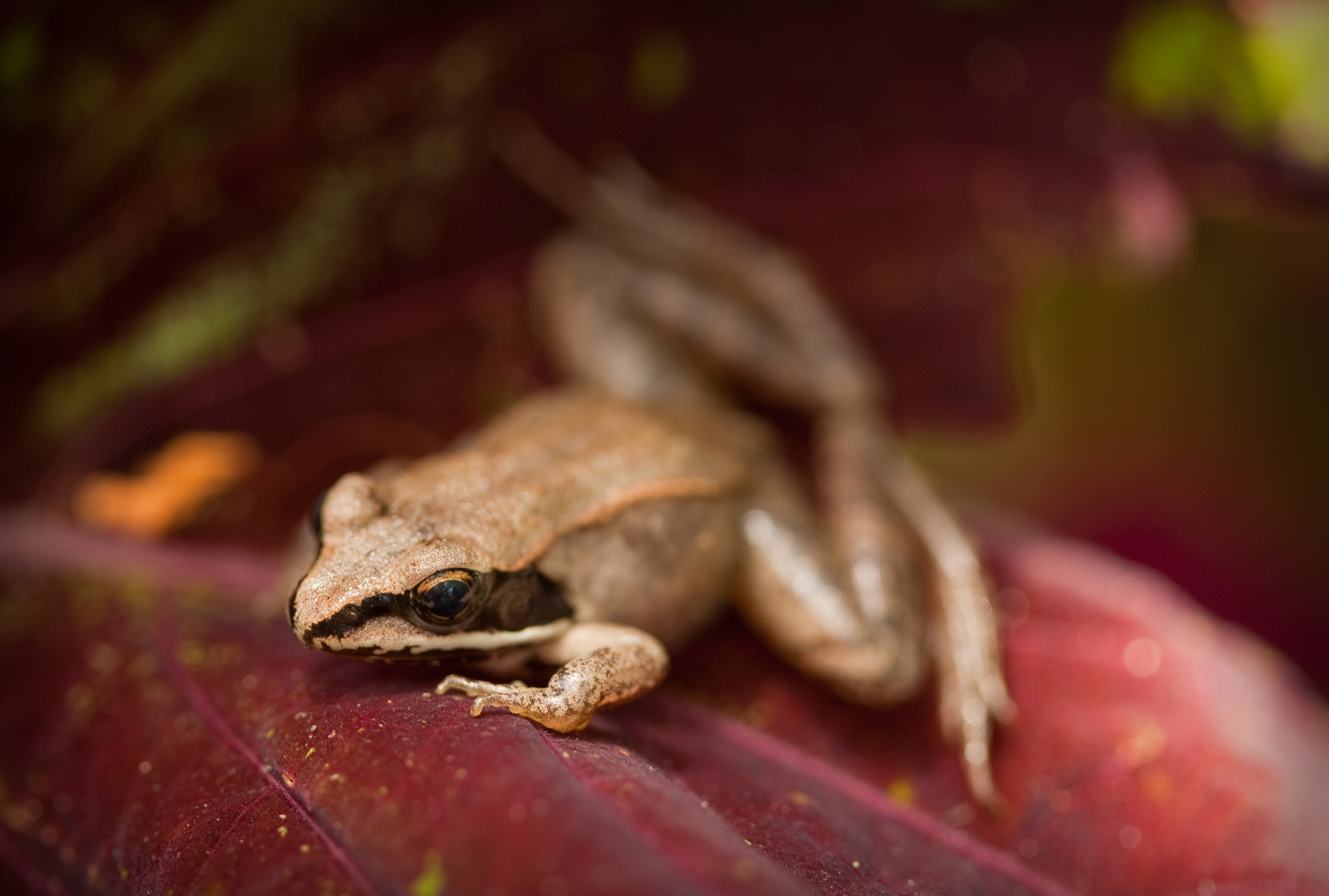
Wood frog demonstrating lighter skin tones, New Jersey Pine Barrens

Wood frogs range from 51 to 70 mm (2.0 to 2.8 in) in length. Females are larger than males. Adult wood frogs are usually brown, tan, or rust-colored, and usually have a dark eye mask. Individual frogs are capable of varying their color; Conant (1958) depicts one individual which was light brown and dark brown at different times. The underparts of wood frogs are pale with a yellow or green cast; in northern populations, the belly may be faintly mottled. Their body colour may change seasonally; exposure to sunlight causes darkening.

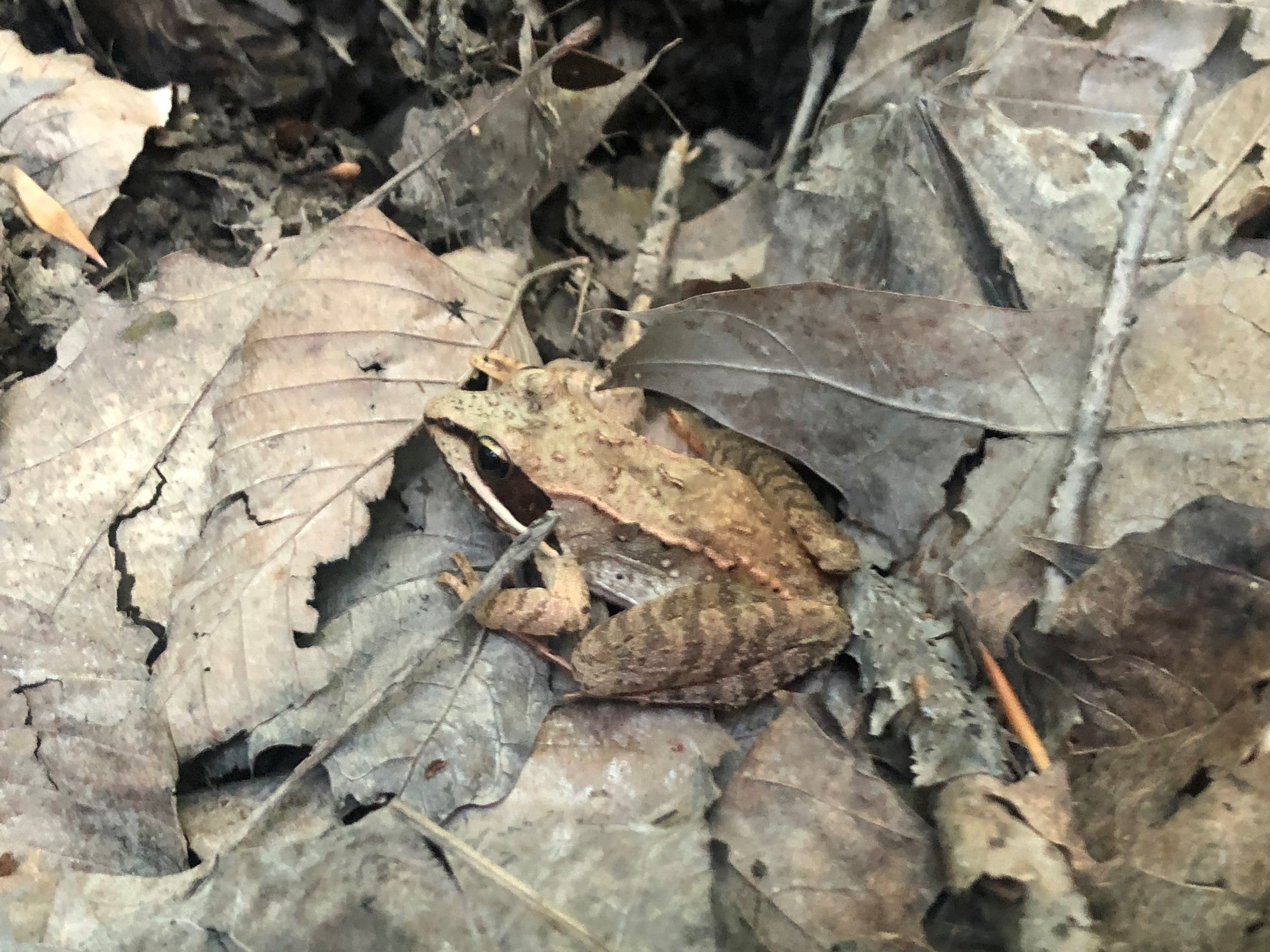
Showing ground leaf camouflage pattern, Darien Lakes State Park in New York

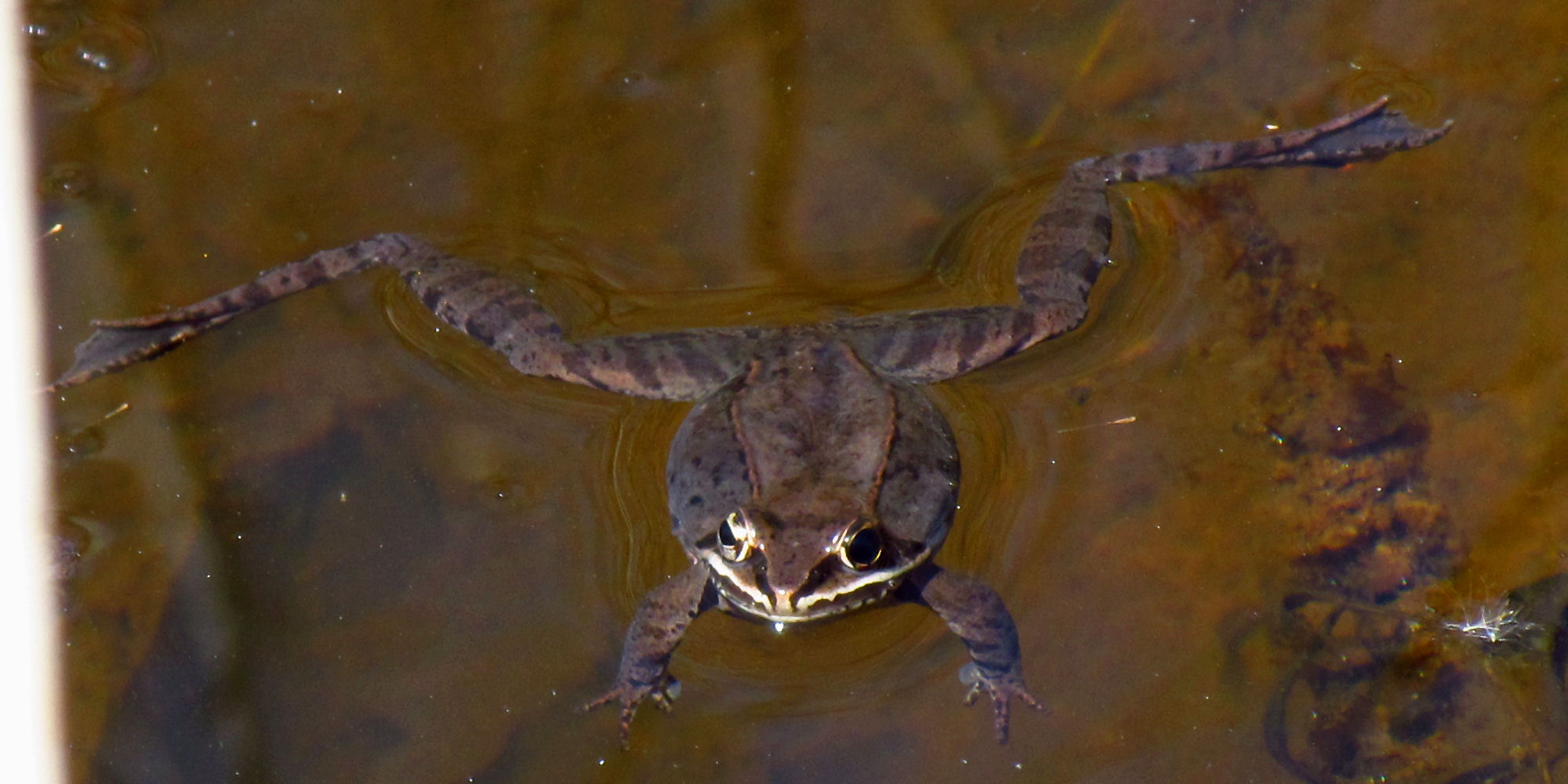
Showing dark skin tones, Mer Bleue Conservation Area, Ontario

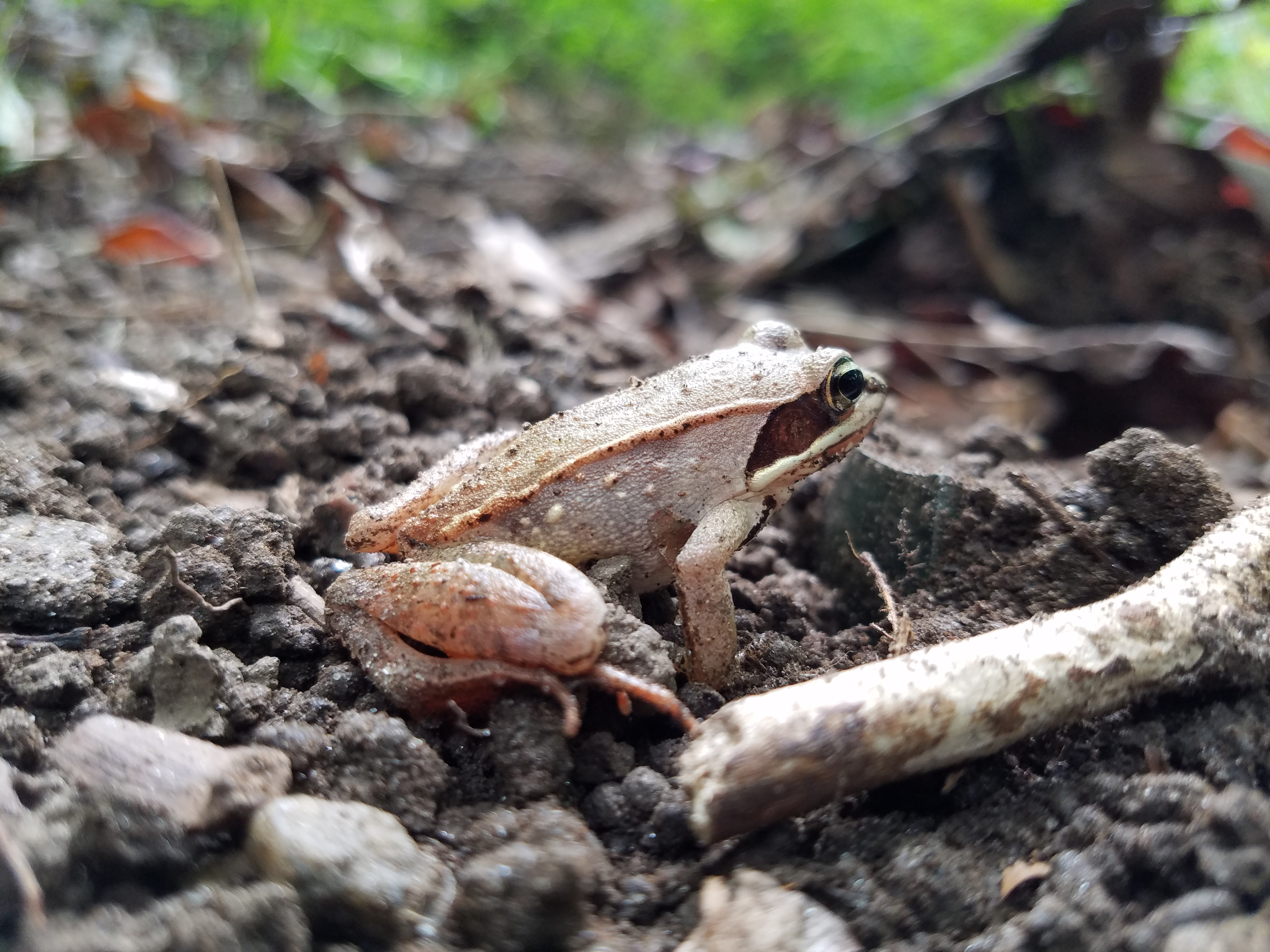
Depicting a pinkish-tan skin tone, White Clay Creek State Park in Delaware

== Geographic range ==
The contiguous wood frog range is from northern Georgia and northeastern Canada in the east to southern British Columbia and Alaska in the west. They range all throughout the boreal forests of Canada. It is the most widely distributed frog in Alaska. It is also found in the Medicine Bow National Forest in the U.S. states of Wyoming and Colorado. This frog is the only North American frog that occurs north of the Arctic Circle.

== Habitat ==
Wood frogs are forest-dwelling, and breed primarily in ephemeral, freshwater wetlands: woodland vernal pools. They are nonarboreal, and able to camouflage themselves with their surroundings, spend most of their time on the forest floor. Long-distance migration plays an important role in their life history. Individual wood frogs range widely (hundreds of metres) among their breeding pools and neighboring freshwater swamps, cool-moist ravines, and/or upland habitats. Genetic neighborhoods of individual pool breeding populations extend more than a kilometre away from the breeding site.

Spring mating calls

A study was done on wood frogs dispersal patterns in five ponds at the Appalachian Mountains, which reported adult wood frogs were 100% faithful to the pond of their first breeding but 18% of juveniles dispersed to breed in other ponds.

Adult wood frogs spend summer months in moist woodlands, forested swamps, ravines, or bogs. During the fall, they leave summer habitats and migrate to neighboring uplands to overwinter. Some may remain in moist areas to overwinter. Hibernacula tend to be in the upper organic layers of the soil, under leaf litter. By overwintering in uplands adjacent to breeding pools, adults ensure a short migration to thawed pools in early spring. Wood frogs are mostly diurnal and are rarely seen at night, except maybe in breeding choruses. Along with spring peepers, they are one of the first amphibians to emerge for breeding right after snowmelt.

== Feeding ==
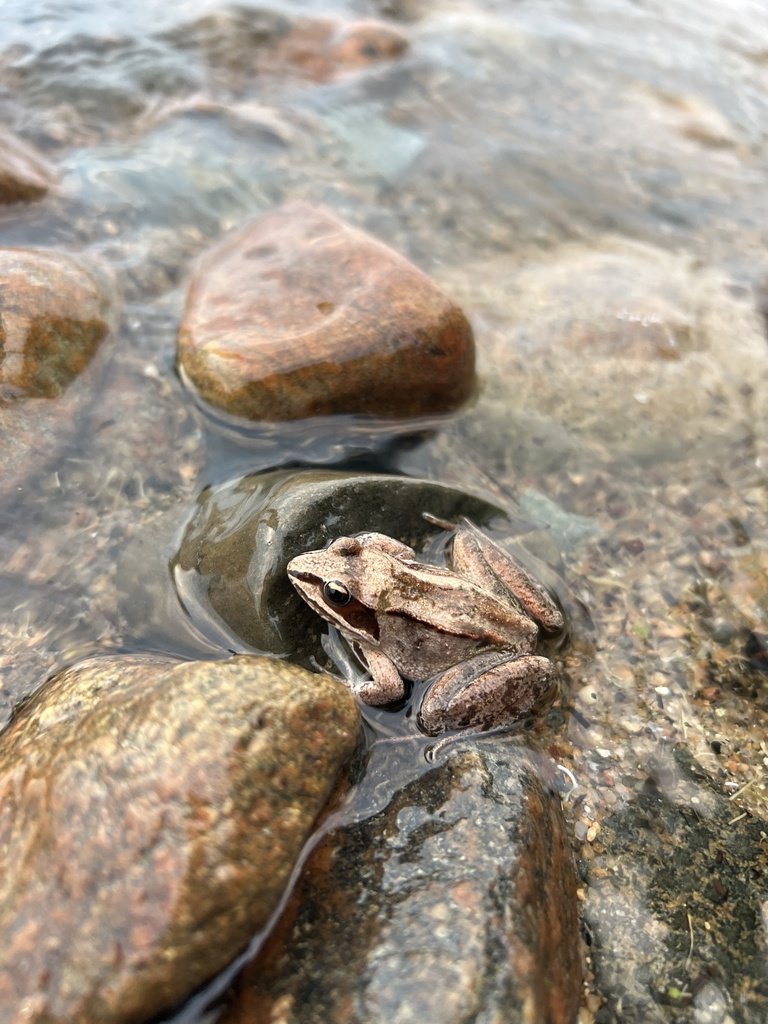
Picture of a wood frog on the shoreline of Kabekona Lake, Minnesota

Wood frogs eat a variety of small, forest-floor invertebrates, with a diet primarily consisting of insects. The tadpoles are omnivorous, feeding on plant detritus and algae along with other tadpoles of their own and other species.

The feeding pattern of the wood frog is similar to that of other ranids. It is triggered by prey movement and consists of a bodily lunge that terminates with the mouth opening and an extension of the tongue onto the prey. The ranid tongue is attached to the floor of the mouth near the tip of the jaw, and when the mouth is closed, the tongue lies flat, extended posteriorly from its point of attachment.

In the feeding strike, the tongue is swung forward as though on a hinge, so some portion of the normally dorsal and posterior tongue surface makes contact with the prey. At this point in the feeding strike, the wood frog differs markedly from more aquatic Lithobates species, such as the green frog, leopard frog, and bullfrog. The wood frog makes contact with the prey with just the tip of its tongue, much like a toad. A more extensive amount of tongue surface is applied in the feeding strikes of these other frog species, with the result that usually the prey is engulfed by the fleshy tongue and considerable tongue surface contacts the surrounding substrate.

== Cold tolerance ==
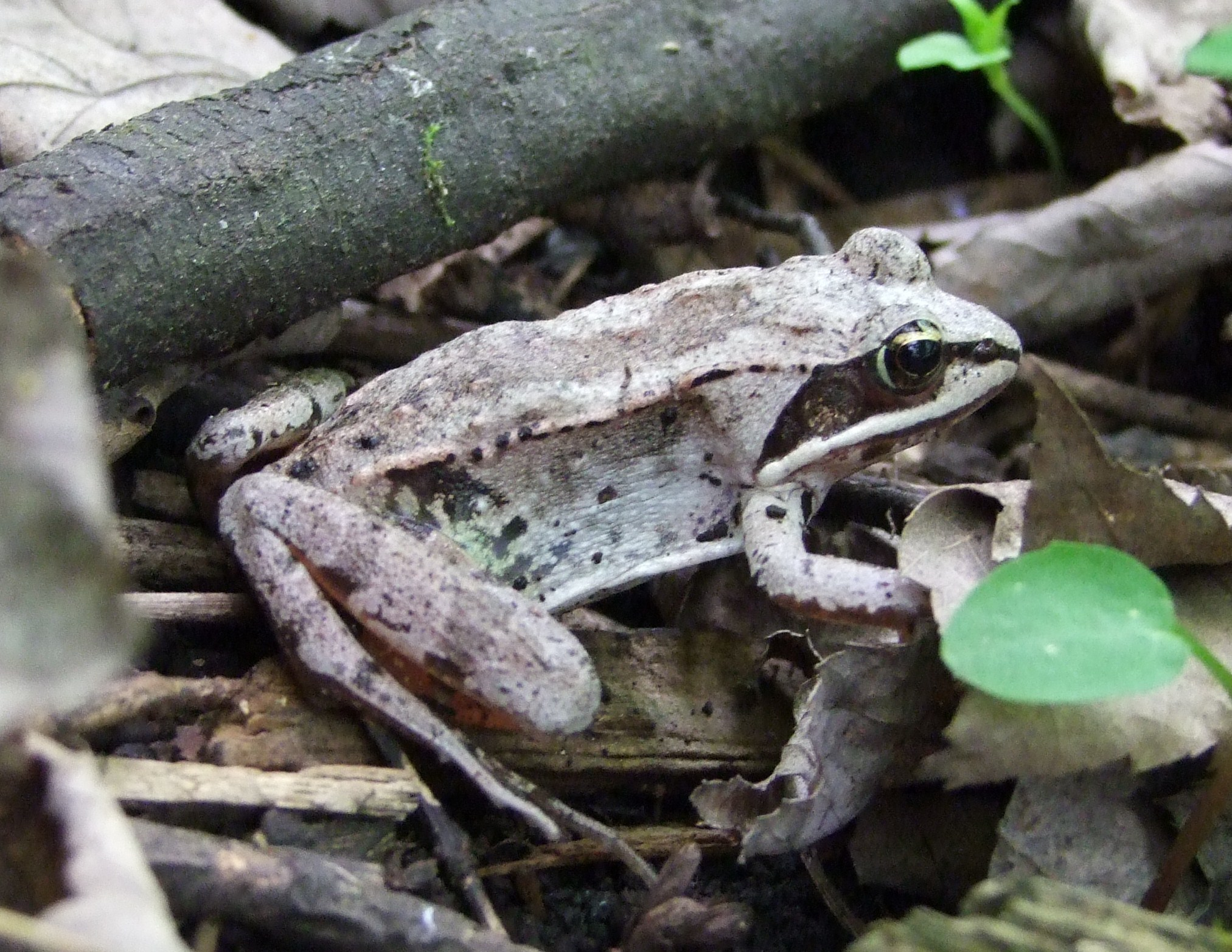
Lithobates sylvaticus found in southern Quebec

Similar to other northern frogs that enter dormancy close to the surface in soil and/or leaf litter, wood frogs can tolerate the freezing of their blood and other tissues. Urea is accumulated in tissues in preparation for overwintering, and liver glycogen is converted in large quantities to glucose in response to internal ice formation. Both urea and glucose act as cryoprotectants to limit the amount of ice that forms and to reduce osmotic shrinkage of cells. Frogs found in southern Canada and the American midwest can tolerate freezing temperatures of −3 to −6 °C (27 to 21 °F). However, wood frogs in Interior Alaska exhibit even greater tolerance, with some of their body water freezing while still surviving. When frozen, wood frogs have no detectable vital signs: no heartbeat, breathing, blood circulation, muscle movement, or detectable brain activity. Wood frogs in natural hibernation remain frozen for 193 +/- 11 consecutive days and reached an average (October–May) temperature of −6.3 °C (20.7 °F) and an average minimum temperature of −14.6 ± 2.8 °C (5.7 ± 5.0 °F). The wood frog has evolved various physiological adaptations that allow it to tolerate the freezing of 65–70% of its total body water. When water freezes, ice crystals form in cells and break up the structure, so that when the ice thaws the cells are damaged. Frozen frogs also need to endure the interruption of oxygen delivery to their tissues as well as strong dehydration and shrinkage of their cells when water is drawn out of cells to freeze. The wood frog has evolved traits that prevent their cells from being damaged when frozen and thawed out, and allow it to effectively combat prolonged ischemia/anoxia and extreme cellular dehydration. One crucial mechanism utilized by the wood frog is the accumulation of high amounts of glucose that act as a cryoprotectant.

Frogs can survive many freeze/thaw events during winter if no more than about 65%-70% of the total body water freezes. Wood frogs have a series of seven amino acid substitutions in the sarco/endoplasmic reticulum Ca^{2+}-ATPase 1 (SERCA 1) enzyme ATP binding site that allows this pump to function at lower temperatures relative to less cold-tolerant species (e.g. Lithobates clamitans).

Studies on northern subpopulations found that Alaskan wood frogs had a larger liver glycogen reserve and greater urea production compared to those in more temperate zones of its range. These conspecifics also showed higher glycogen phosphorylase enzymatic activity, which facilitates their adaptation to freezing.

The phenomenon of cold resistance is observed in other anuran species. The Japanese tree frog shows even greater cold tolerance than the wood frog, surviving in temperatures as low as −35 °C (−31 °F) for up to 120 days.

== Reproduction ==
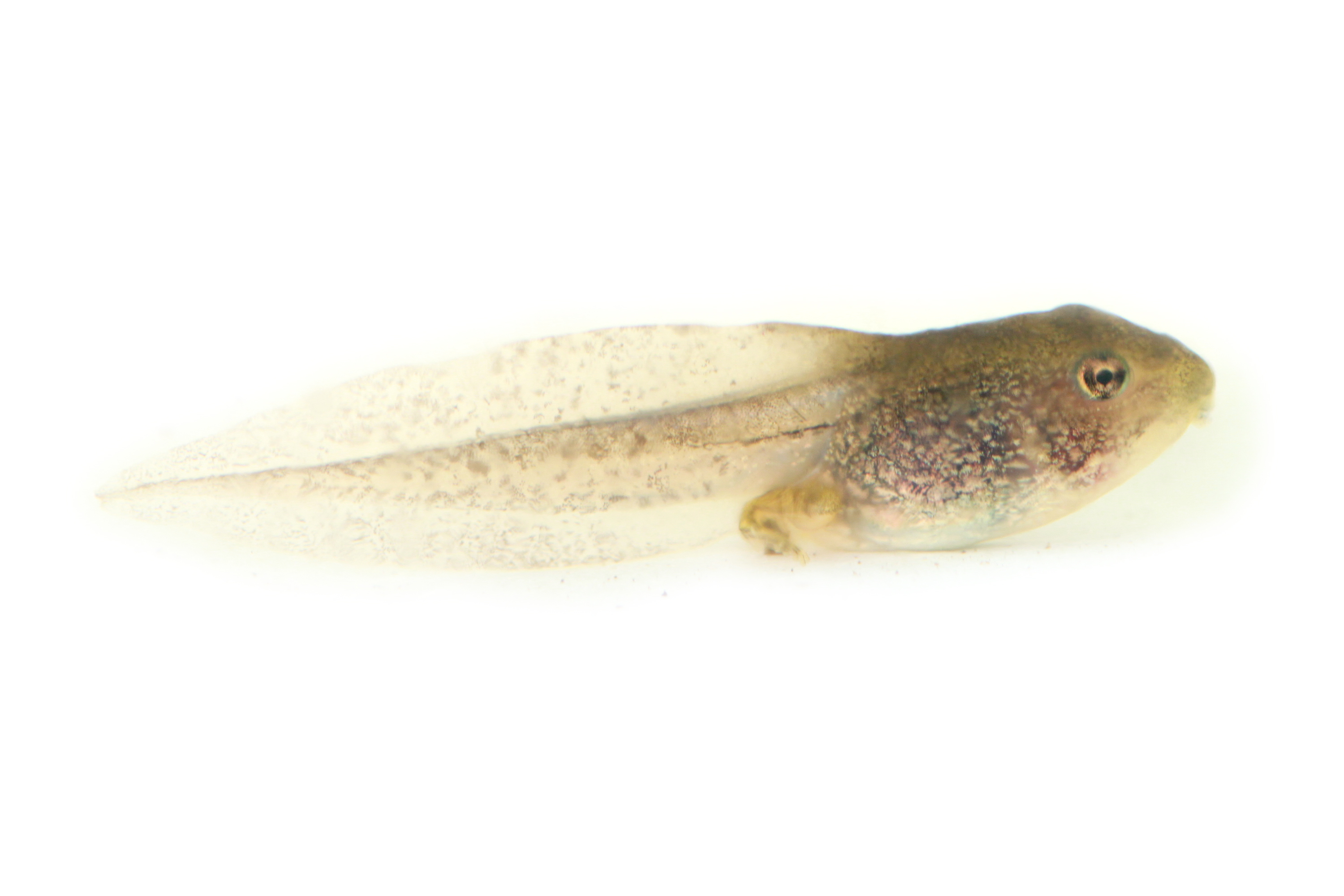
Wood frog tadpole

L. sylvaticus primarily breeds in ephemeral pools rather than permanent water bodies such as ponds or lakes. This is believed to provide some protection for the adult frogs and their offspring (eggs and tadpoles) from predation by fish and other predators of permanent water bodies. Adult wood frogs typically hibernate within 65 meters of breeding pools. They emerge from hibernation in early spring and migrate to the nearby pools. There, males chorus, emitting duck-like quacking sounds.

Wood frogs are considered explosive breeders; many populations will conduct all mating in the span of a week. Males actively search for mates by swimming around the pool and calling. Females, on the other hand, will stay under the water and rarely surface, most likely to avoid sexual harassment. A male approaches a female and clasps her from behind her forearms before hooking his thumbs together in a hold called "amplexus", which is continued until the female deposits the eggs. Females deposit eggs attached to submerged substrate, typically vegetation or downed branches. Most commonly, females deposit eggs adjacent to other egg masses, creating large aggregations of masses.

Some advantage is conferred to pairs first to breed, as clutches closer to the center of the raft absorb heat and develop faster than those on the periphery, and have more protection from predators. If pools dry before tadpoles metamorphose into froglets, they die. This constitutes the risk counterbalancing the antipredator protection of ephemeral pools. By breeding in early spring, however, wood frogs increase their offspring's chances of metamorphosing before pools dry.

The larvae undergo two stages of development: fertilization to free-living tadpoles, and free-living tadpoles to juvenile frogs. During the first stage, the larvae are adapted for rapid development, and their growth depends on the temperature of the water. Variable larval survival is a major contributor to fluctuations in wood frog population size from year to year. The second stage of development features rapid development and growth, and depends on environmental factors including food availability, temperature, and population density.

Some studies suggest that road-salts, as used in road de-icing, may have toxic effects on wood frog larvae. A study exposed wood frog tadpoles to NaCl and found that tadpoles experienced reduced activity and weight, and even displayed physical abnormalities. There was also significantly lower survivorship and decreased time to metamorphosis with increasing salt concentration. De-icing agents may pose a serious conservation concern to wood frog larvae. Another study has found increased tolerance to salt with higher concentrations, though the authors caution against over-extrapolating from short-term, high concentration studies to longer-term, lower concentration conditions, as contradictory outcomes occur.

Following metamorphosis, a small percentage (less than 20%) of juveniles will disperse, permanently leaving the vicinity of their natal pools. The majority of offspring are philopatric, returning to their natal pool to breed. Most frogs breed only once in their lives, although some will breed two or three times, generally with differences according to age. The success of the larvae and tadpoles is important in populations of wood frogs because they affect the gene flow and genetic variation of the following generations.

Adult wood frogs are prey for larger frogs, garter snakes, ribbon snakes, northern water snakes, herons, raccoons, skunks, and American mink. Tadpoles are prey for diving beetles, water bugs and salamander larvae. Leeches, eastern newts and aquatic insects may eat the eggs of wood frogs.

== Conservation status ==
Although the wood frog is not endangered or threatened, in many parts of its range, urbanization is fragmenting populations. Several studies have shown, under certain thresholds of forest cover loss or over certain thresholds of road density, wood frogs and other common amphibians begin to "drop out" of formerly occupied habitats. Another conservation concern is that wood frogs are primarily dependent on smaller, "geographically isolated" wetlands for breeding. At least in the United States, these wetlands are largely unprotected by federal law, leaving it up to states to tackle the problem of conserving pool-breeding amphibians.

The wood frog has a complex lifecycle that depends on multiple habitats, damp lowlands, and adjacent woodlands. Their habitat conservation is, therefore, complex, requiring integrated, landscape-scale preservation.

Wood frog development in the tadpole stage is known to be negatively affected by road salt contaminating freshwater ecosystems. Tadpoles have also been shown to develop abnormalities due to a combination of warmer conditions and toxic metals from pesticides near their habitats. These conditions allow them to be predated upon by dragonfly larvae more easily often causing missing limbs.
