= Vitrification =

Transformation of a substance into a glass

Vitrification (from Latin vitrum 'glass', via French vitrifier) is the full or partial transformation of a substance into glass. In the production of ceramics, vitrification is responsible for their impermeability to water.

The most common applications are in the making of pottery, glass, and some types of food, but there are many others, such as the vitrification of an antifreeze-like liquid in cryopreservation. Vitrification is also used in the disposal and long-term storage of radioactive waste, in which the waste is immobilized within a hardened glass material considered more stable for containment.

In Herculaneum, the Roman town destroyed by the eruption of Mount Vesuvius in 79 AD, a piece of glass-like organic material was found inside the skull of a man. It is proposed to be the person's brain, vitrified by the extreme temperature of a pyroclastic flow, possibly higher than 510 °C (950 °F).

== Ceramics ==
Vitrification is the progressive partial fusion of a clay, or of a body, as a result of a firing process. As vitrification proceeds, the proportion of glassy bond increases and the apparent porosity of the fired product becomes progressively lower. Vitreous bodies have open porosity, and may be either opaque or translucent. In this context, "zero porosity" may be defined as less than 1% water absorption. However, various standard procedures define the conditions of water absorption. An example is by ASTM, who state "The term vitreous generally signifies less than 0.5% absorption, except for floor and wall tile and low-voltage electrical insulators, which are considered vitreous up to 3% water absorption."

Pottery can be made impermeable to water by glazing or by vitrification. Porcelain, bone china, and sanitaryware are examples of vitrified pottery, and are impermeable even without glaze. Stoneware may be vitrified or semi-vitrified; the latter type would not be impermeable without glaze.

== Applications ==
When sucrose is cooled slowly it results in crystal sugar (or rock candy), but when cooled rapidly it can form syrupy cotton candy (candy/fairy floss).

Vitrification can also occur in a liquid such as water, usually through very rapid cooling or the introduction of agents that suppress the formation of ice crystals. This is in contrast to ordinary freezing which results in ice crystal formation. Vitrification is used in cryo-electron microscopy to cool samples so quickly that they can be imaged with an electron microscope without damage. In 2017, the Nobel prize for Chemistry was awarded for the development of this technology, which can be used to image objects such as proteins or virus particles.

Ordinary soda–lime glass, used in windows and drinking containers, is created by the addition of sodium carbonate and lime (calcium oxide) to silicon dioxide. Without these additives, silicon dioxide would require very high temperature to obtain a melt, and subsequently (with slow cooling) a glass.

Vitrification is used in disposal and long-term storage of nuclear waste or other hazardous wastes. Waste is mixed with glass-forming chemicals in a furnace to form molten glass that then solidifies in canisters, thereby immobilizing the waste. The final waste form resembles obsidian and is a non-leaching, durable material that effectively traps the waste inside. It is widely assumed that such waste can be stored for relatively long periods in this form without concern for air or groundwater contamination. Bulk vitrification uses electrodes to melt soil and wastes where they lie buried. The hardened waste may then be disinterred with less danger of widespread contamination. According to the Pacific Northwest National Labs, "Vitrification locks dangerous materials into a stable glass form that will last for thousands of years."

=== Vitrification in cryopreservation ===
Vitrification in cryopreservation is used to preserve, for example, human egg cells (oocytes) (in oocyte cryopreservation) and embryos (in embryo cryopreservation). It prevents ice crystal formation and is a very fast process: -23,000 °C/min.

Currently, vitrification techniques have only been applied to brains (neurovitrification) by Alcor and to the upper body by the Cryonics Institute, but research is in progress by both organizations to apply vitrification to the whole body.

Many woody plants living in polar regions naturally vitrify their cells to survive the cold. Some can survive immersion in liquid nitrogen and liquid helium. Vitrification can also be used to preserve endangered plant species and their seeds. For example, recalcitrant seeds are considered hard to preserve. Plant vitrification solution (PVS), one of application of vitrification, has successfully preserved Nymphaea caerulea seeds.

Additives used in cryobiology or produced naturally by organisms living in polar regions are called cryoprotectants.

Tg (Glass transition temperature) of sugars and plant vitrification solutions
Formula	T_{g} (Mid, °C)
1M sucrose	-30.9
1M glucose	-41.3
1M trehalose	-68.0
50% sucrose + 50% glycerol (PVS3)	-90.7
50% sucrose + 50% (ethylene glycol) EG	-101.1
50% sucrose + 50% (propylene glycol) PG	-89.1
75% sucrose + 25% glycerol	-81.2
75% sucrose + 25% EG	-80.7
75% sucrose + 25% PG	-63.6
25% sucrose + 75% glycerol	-91.3
25% sucrose + 75% EG	-108.9
25% sucrose + 75% PG	-98.0

== Vesuvius eruption ==
One study suggests that, during the eruption of Mount Vesuvius in 79 AD, a victim's brain was vitrified by the extreme heat of the volcanic ash. This claim has been disputed.

== See also ==
- Cryogenics
- Crystallization
- Supercooling
- Vitrified fort

== Literature ==
- Ashle, Steven (June 2002). "Divide and Vitrify" (PDF). Scientific American. 286 (6): 17–19. Bibcode:2002SciAm.286f..17A. doi:10.1038/scientificamerican0602-17.
- Lovgren, Stefan. "Corpses Frozen for Future Rebirth by Arizona Company", March 2005, National Geographic
