= Cells Alive System =

The Cells Alive System (CAS) is a line of commercial freezers manufactured by ABI Corporation, Ltd. of Chiba, Japan claimed to preserve food with greater freshness than ordinary freezing by using electromagnetic fields and mechanical vibrations to limit ice crystal formation that destroys food texture. They also are claimed to increase tissue survival without having its water replaced by cryogenically compatible fluids; whether they have any effect is unclear. The freezers have attracted attention from the food processing industry.
