= Greg Fahy =

US cryobiologist and businessman

- Born: Gregory Michael Fahy; 1950 (age 75–76); California, U.S.
- Education: University of California, Irvine (BSc); Medical College of Georgia (PhD)
- Occupations: Cryobiologist; Biogerontologist; Businessman

Gregory Michael Fahy is a California-based cryobiologist, biogerontologist, and businessman. He is the vice president and chief scientific officer at 21st Century Medicine, Inc, and has co-founded Intervene Immune, a company developing clinical methods to reverse immune system aging. He was the 2022–2023 president of the Society for Cryobiology.

== Education ==
A native of California, Fahy holds a Bachelor of Science degree in biology from the University of California, Irvine and a PhD in pharmacology and cryobiology from the Medical College of Georgia in Augusta.

He currently serves on the board of directors of two organizations and as a referee for numerous scientific journals and funding agencies, and holds 35 patents on cryopreservation methods, aging interventions, transplantation, and other topics.

== Career ==
Fahy is the world's foremost expert in organ cryopreservation by vitrification. Fahy introduced the modern successful approach to vitrification for cryopreservation in cryobiology and he is widely credited, along with William F. Rall, for introducing vitrification into the field of reproductive biology.

In 2005, where he was a keynote speaker at the annual Society for Cryobiology meeting, Fahy announced that 21st Century Medicine had successfully cryopreserved a rabbit kidney at −130 °C by vitrification and transplanted it into a rabbit after rewarming, with subsequent long-term life support by the vitrified-rewarmed kidney as the sole kidney. This research breakthrough was later published in the peer-reviewed journal Organogenesis.

Fahy is also a biogerontologist and is the originator and editor-in-chief of The Future of Aging: Pathways to Human Life Extension, a multi-authored book on the future of biogerontology. He currently serves on the editorial boards of Rejuvenation Research and the Open Geriatric Medicine Journal and served for 16 years as a director of the American Aging Association and for 6 years as the editor of AGE News, the organization's newsletter.

== Research ==
As a scientist with the American Red Cross, Fahy was the originator of the first practical method of cryopreservation by vitrification and the inventor of computer-based systems to apply this technology to whole organs. Before joining Twenty-First Century Medicine, he was the chief scientist for Organ, Inc and of LRT, Inc. He was also Head of the Tissue Cryopreservation Section of the Transfusion and Cryopreservation Research Program of the U.S. Naval Medical Research Institute in Bethesda, Maryland where he spearheaded the original concept of ice blocking agents. In 2014, he was named a Fellow of the Society for Cryobiology in recognition of the impact of his work in low temperature biology.

In 2015–2017, Fahy led the TRIIM (Thymus Regeneration, Immunorestoration, and Insulin Mitigation) human clinical trial, designed to reverse aspects of human aging. The purpose of the TRIIM trial was to investigate the possibility of using recombinant human growth hormone (rhGH) to prevent or reverse signs of immunosenescence in ten 51‐ to 65‐year‐old putatively healthy men. The study:

Observed protective immunological changes, improved risk indices for many age‐related diseases, and a mean epigenetic age approximately 1.5 years less than baseline after 1 year of treatment (−2.5‐year change compared to no treatment at the end of the study).

== Awards ==
Fahy was named as a Fellow of the Society for Cryobiology in 2014, and in 2010 he received the Distinguished Scientist Award for Reproductive Biology from the Reproductive Biology Professional Group of the American Society of Reproductive Medicine. He received the Cryopreservation Award from the International Longevity and Cryopreservation Summit held in Madrid, Spain in 2017 in recognition of his career in and dedication to the field of cryobiology. Fahy also received the Grand Prize for Medicine from INPEX in 1995 for his invention of computerized organ cryoprotectant perfusion technology. In 2005, he was recognized as a Fellow of the American Aging Association.

== Publications ==
- The Future of Aging: Pathways to Human Life Extension ISBN 978-9048139989
- Death and Anti-Death, Volume 8: Fifty Years After Albert Camus (1913–1960) ISBN 9781934297117
