= Plant cryopreservation =

Plant conservation strategy

Plant cryopreservation is a genetic resource conservation strategy that allows plant material, such as seeds, pollen, shoot tips or dormant buds to be stored indefinitely in liquid nitrogen. After thawing, these genetic resources can be regenerated into plants and used on the field. While this cryopreservation conservation strategy can be used on all plants, it is often only used under certain circumstances: 1) crops with recalcitrant seeds e.g. avocado, coconut 2) seedless crops such as cultivated banana and plantains or 3) crops that are clonally propagated such as cassava, potato, garlic and sweet potato.

== History ==
The history of plant cryopreservation started in 1965 when Dai Hirai was studying the biology activities that happened when biological samples were frozen. Three years later, there was the first successful attempt cryopreserving callus cells. The following years, new methods to cryopreserve were developed, such as direct immersion, slow freezing and vitrification, as well as applied to more and more plants species and plant tissues.

== Methods ==
- Direct immersion. This is the immersion of plant material directly in liquid nitrogen, or after desiccation. This is often done with (orthodox) seeds that already have a low moisture content or pollen. This method cannot be used with tissues that contain a lot of water or are sensitive to dehydration.
- Slow freezing. This method relies on the mechanism of freeze dehydration to pull water out of the cells and thus prevent ice formation in the cell.
- Vitrification. By freezing at an ultra-fast rate and using osmotic dehydration, the water that is still present in the cell is unable to form crystals and will be part of a glass-like or vitrified solution. This method can be further split in different variants e.g. droplet vitrification, encapsulation dehydration and plate vitrification. These techniques were successfully used with several economically important crops, such as chrysanthemum or bleeding heart.

== Hurdles and limitations ==
Aside from the challenges involved with cryopreservation in general, an important hurdle, when developing cryopreservation protocols for storage of plant germplasm, is that plants within a species can have a different tolerance to cryopreservation. This difference seems to be linked with the drought resistance of the different cultivars within the species. Even within the plant itself there can be noticeable differences depending on the tissue that is used, as both structure and composition play an important role during cryopreservation.

== Organizations relying on plant cryopreservation ==
- Alliance of Bioversity International and Ciat
- International Potato Center
- Huntington Garden
- Rural development administration of Korea
- Leibniz Institute of Plant Genetics and Crop Plant Research
