= Brain Preservation Foundation =

American research and development nonprofit

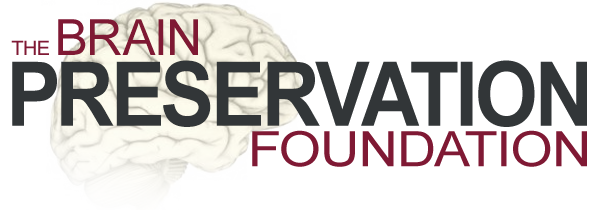
- Founded: 27 August 2010
- Founder: Kenneth Hayworth and John Smart
- Type: United States IRS exemption status: 501(c)(3), ruling year 2010
- Purpose: to promote validated scientific research and technical services development in the field of whole brain preservation for long-term static storage
- Region served: Global
- Key people: President Kenneth Hayworth
- Website: www.brainpreservation.org

The Brain Preservation Foundation is an American non-profit organization with the goal of promoting validated scientific research and technical services development in the field of whole brain preservation for long-term static storage, as well as working on the accessibility, affordability, and sustainability of this technology. It also provides public education on topics such as the neural foundations of memory, brain scanning techniques, brain preservation, and mind uploading.

== Prizes ==
In 2010, the Brain Preservation Foundation launched an inducement prize contest with the goal of improving the long-run preservation of human brains. The purpose of preserving a human brain is to allow the mind uploading of the preserved brain's long-term memories if the technology becomes available to do so in the long-run future. The requirements of the Brain Preservation Technology Prize stated that the connectome of a brain had to be preserved in a way that would allow for long-term storage (>100 years).

On February 9, 2016, the Small Mammal Brain Preservation Prize was officially won by the cryobiology research company 21st Century Medicine. On March 13, 2018, the Large Mammal Brain Preservation Prize was officially won, again by 21st Century Medicine.

== See also ==
- Cryonics
- 21st Century Medicine
- Information-theoretic death
