= Kabekona Lake =

Lake in the state of Minnesota, United States

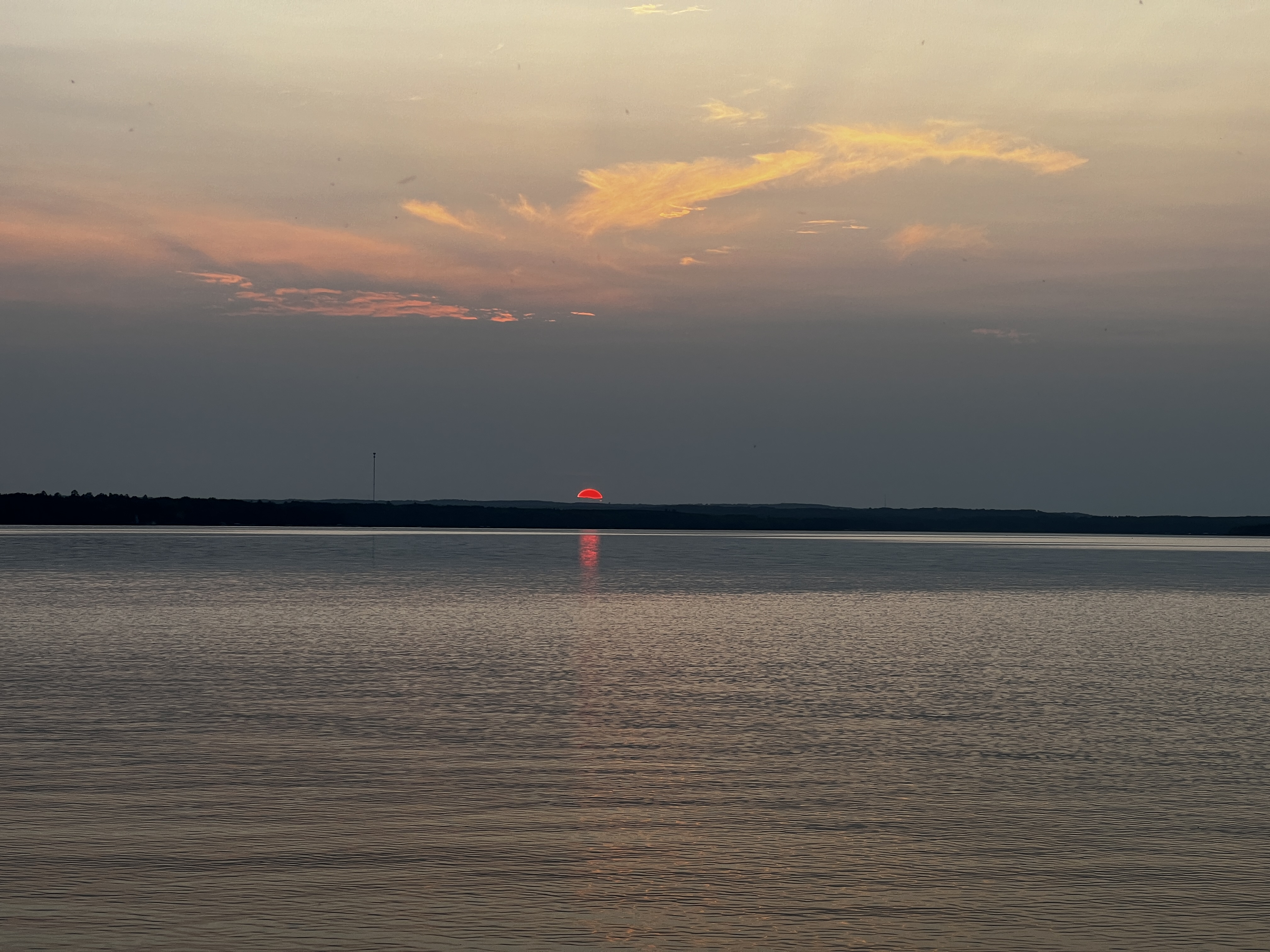
- A sunset taking place in Kabekona Lake

- Location within Minnesota

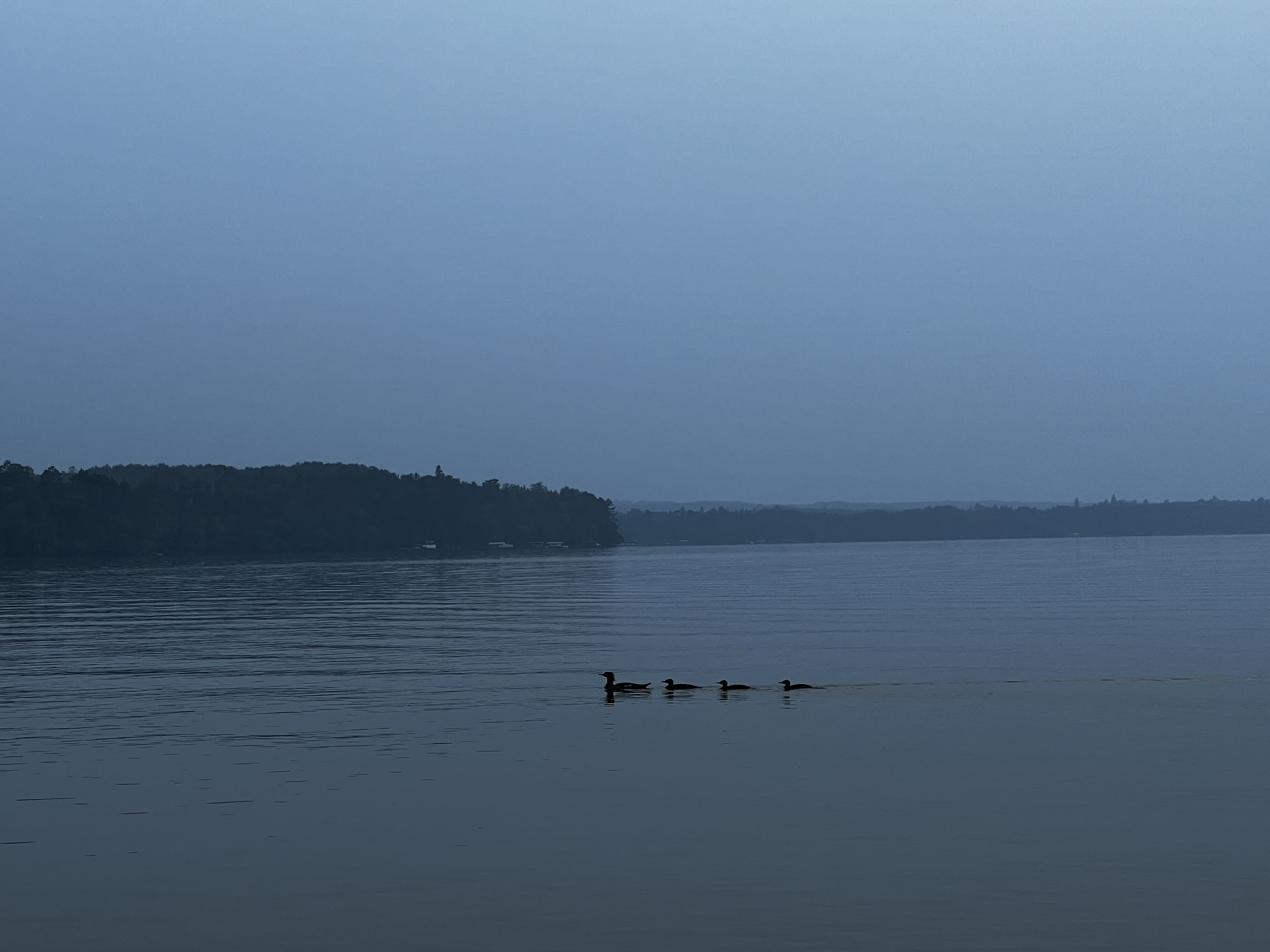
- Loons swimming in the lake
- Location: Hubbard County, Minnesota
- Coordinates: 47.1622°N 94.7639°W
- Basin countries: United States
- Surface area: 2,433 acres (10 km^{2})
- Max. depth: 133 ft (41 m)

Kabekona Lake is a clear lake in northern Minnesota, United States, located 3.0 miles south of Laporte in Hubbard County. Kabekona has a surface area of 2,433 acres (10 km^{2}) and a maximum depth of 133 feet (41 m) — with an average depth of 53 feet (16 m). Kabekona (Gabekana in the Ojibwe language) means "End of the Trail" to dissuade others from venturing to the very clear lake. Kabekona is the 2nd clearest lake in Minnesota.

This spring-fed lake is known for its loon birdlife. At one point it was thought to be the source of the Mississippi River. Among the most popular fishes in this lake are yellow perch, bass, northern pike, and walleye.
