= Cryostasis (clathrate hydrates) =

Reversible cryopreservation of live biological objects

The term cryostasis was introduced to name the reversible preservation technology for live biological objects which is based on using clathrate-forming gaseous substances under increased hydrostatic pressure and hypothermic temperatures.

Living tissues cooled below the freezing point of water are damaged by the dehydration of the cells as ice is formed between the cells. The mechanism of freezing damage in living biological tissues has been elucidated by Renfret. The vapor pressure of the ice is lower than the vapor pressure of the solute water in the surrounding cells and as heat is removed at the freezing point of the solutions, the ice crystals grow between the cells, extracting water from them. As the ice crystals grow, the volume of the cells shrinks, and the cells are crushed between the ice crystals. Additionally, as the cells shrink, the solutes inside the cells are concentrated in the remaining water, increasing the intracellular ionic strength and interfering with the organization of the proteins and other organized intercellular structures. Eventually, the solute concentration inside the cells reaches the eutectic and freezes. The final state of frozen tissues is pure ice in the former extracellular spaces, and inside the cell membranes a mixture of concentrated cellular components in ice and bound water. In general, this process is not reversible to the point of restoring the tissues to life.

Cryostasis utilizes clathrate-forming gases that penetrate and saturate the biological tissues causing clathrate hydrates formation (under specific pressure-temperature conditions) inside the cells and in the extracellular matrix. Clathrate hydrates are a class of solids in which gas molecules occupy "cages" made up of hydrogen-bonded water molecules. These "cages" are unstable when empty, collapsing into conventional ice crystal structure, but they are stabilised by the inclusion of the gas molecule within them. Most low molecular weight gases (including CH_{4}, H_{2}S, Ar, Kr, and Xe) will form a hydrate under some pressure-temperature conditions. Clathrates formation will prevent the biological tissues from dehydration which will cause irreversible inactivation of intracellular enzymes.

== See also ==
- Cryopreservation
- Cryoprotectant
- Hibernation
