= Society for Cryobiology =

Scientific society founded in 1964

The Society for Cryobiology is an international scientific society that was founded in 1964. Its objectives are to promote research in low temperature biology, to improve scientific understanding in this field, and to disseminate and aid in the application of this knowledge. The Society also publishes a journal called Cryobiology.

The society has hosted 60 annual meetings to date, with the 2024 annual meeting being held in Washington. The three-day event will host over 350 delegates from more than 35 countries.

== Presidents of the society ==
A list of past presidents of the society is in the following

- 1964 – 1965 Basile J. Luyet
- 1966 – 1967 Ronald I. N. Greaves
- 1967 – 1968 Donald Greiff
- 1968 – 1969 Charles E. Huggins
- 1969 – 1970 Arthur P. Rinfret
- 1970 – 1971 George W. Hyatt
- 1971 – 1973 Jacob Levitt
- 1973 – 1974 Peter Mazur
- 1975 – 1976 David E. Pegg
- 1977 – 1978 Alan P. MacKenzie
- 1979 – 1980 Michael J. Ashwood-Smith
- 1981 – 1982 Harold T. Meryman
- 1983 – 1985 Arthur W. Rowe
- 1985 – 1987 Stanley P. Leibo
- 1987 – 1989 John G. Baust
- 1989 – 1991 S. Randolph May
- 1992 – 1993 James H. Southard
- 1994 – 1995 Kenneth R. Diller
- 1996 – 1997 Peter L. Steponkus
- 1998 – 1999 Locksley E. McGann
- 2000 – 2001 John J. McGrath
- 2002 – 2003 Mehmet Toner
- 2004 – 2005 John C. Bischof
- 2006 – 2007 Andreas Sputtek
- 2008 – 2009 John K. Critser
- 2010 – 2011 Barry J. Fuller
- 2012 – 2013 John H. Crowe
- 2014 – 2015 Erik J. Woods
- 2016 – 2017 Jason P. Acker
- 2018 – 2019 Dayong Gao
- 2020 – 2021 Adam Higgins
- 2022 – 2023 Gregory M. Fahy
- 2024 – 2025 Allison Hubel
- 2026 – 2027 John M. Baust
