= Waterbug =

Waterbug or water bug can refer to any of several things:

True bugs

- The true water bugs (Nepomorpha), including such insects as giant water bugs (Belostomatidae), creeping water bugs (Naucoridae) and backswimmers (Notonectidae)
- Various other aquatic true bugs (Hemiptera), known collectively as water bugs (Heteroptera)

Cockroaches

- The American cockroach, Periplaneta americana
- The German cockroach, Blattella germanica
- The Oriental cockroach, Blatta orientalis

== See also ==
- Waterbug Records, a record label
