= 21st Century Medicine =

American cryobiological research company

21st Century Medicine (21CM) is a California cryobiological research company which has as its primary focus the development of perfusates and protocols for viable long-term cryopreservation of human organs, tissues and cells at temperatures below −100 °C through the use of vitrification. 21CM was founded in 1993.

In 2004 21CM received a $900,000 grant from the U.S. National Institutes of Health (NIH) to study a preservation solution developed by the University of Rochester in New York for extending simple cold storage time of human hearts removed for transplant.

At the July 2005 annual conference of the Society for Cryobiology, 21st Century Medicine announced the vitrification of a rabbit kidney to −135 °C with their vitrification mixture. The kidney was successfully transplanted upon rewarming to a rabbit, the rabbit being euthanized on the 48th day for histological follow-up.

On February 9, 2016, 21st Century Medicine won the Small Mammal Brain Preservation Prize. On March 13, 2018, they won the Large Mammal Brain Preservation Prize.
