= Cryoprotectant =

Substance used to protect biological tissue from freezing damage

A cryoprotectant is a substance used to protect biological tissue from freezing damage (i.e. that due to ice formation). Arctic and Antarctic insects, fish and amphibians create cryoprotectants (antifreeze compounds and antifreeze proteins) in their bodies to minimize freezing damage during cold winter periods. Cryoprotectants are also used to preserve living materials in the study of biology and to preserve food products.

For years, glycerol has been used in cryobiology as a cryoprotectant for blood cells and bull sperm, allowing storage in liquid nitrogen at temperatures around −196 °C. However, glycerol cannot be used to protect whole organs from damage. Instead, many biotechnology companies are researching the development of other cryoprotectants more suitable for such uses. A successful discovery may eventually make possible the bulk cryogenic storage (or "banking") of transplantable human and xenobiotic organs. A substantial step in that direction has already occurred. Twenty-First Century Medicine has vitrified a rabbit kidney to −135 °C with their proprietary vitrification cocktail. Upon rewarming, the kidney was successfully transplanted into a rabbit, with complete functionality and viability, able to sustain the rabbit indefinitely as the sole functioning kidney.

== Mechanism ==
Cryoprotectants operate by increasing the solute concentration in cells. However, in order to be biologically viable they must easily penetrate and must not be toxic to cells.

=== Glass transition temperature ===
Some cryoprotectants function by lowering the glass transition temperature of a solution or of a material. In this way, the cryoprotectant prevents actual freezing, and the solution maintains some flexibility in a glassy phase. Many cryoprotectants also function by forming hydrogen bonds with biological molecules as water molecules are displaced. Hydrogen bonding in aqueous solutions is important for proper protein and DNA function. Thus, as the cryoprotectant replaces the water molecules, the biological material retains its native physiological structure and function, although they are no longer immersed in an aqueous environment. This preservation strategy is most often utilized in anhydrobiosis.

=== Toxicity ===
Mixtures of cryoprotectants have less toxicity and are more effective than single-agent cryoprotectants. A mixture of formamide with DMSO (dimethyl sulfoxide), propylene glycol, and a colloid was for many years the most effective of all artificially created cryoprotectants. Cryoprotectant mixtures have been used for vitrification (i.e. solidification without crystal ice formation). Vitrification has important applications in preserving embryos, biological tissues and organs for transplant. Vitrification is also used in cryonics, in an effort to eliminate freezing damage.

== Conventional ==
Conventional cryoprotectants are glycols (alcohols containing at least two hydroxyl groups), such as ethylene glycol, propylene glycol and glycerol. Ethylene glycol is commonly used as automobile antifreeze; while propylene glycol has been used to reduce ice formation in ice cream. Dimethyl sulfoxide (DMSO) is also regarded as a conventional cryoprotectant. Glycerol and DMSO have been used for decades by cryobiologists to reduce ice formation in sperm, oocytes, and embryos that are cold-preserved in liquid nitrogen. Cryoconservation of animal genetic resources is a practice that involves conventional cryoprotectants to store genetic material with the intention of future revival. Trehalose is non-reducing sugar produced by yeasts and insects in copious amounts. Its use as a cryoprotectant in commercial systems has been patented widely.

== Examples in nature ==
Arctic fish use antifreeze proteins, sometimes appended with sugars, as cryoprotectants.

=== Insects ===
Insects most often use sugars or polyols as cryoprotectants. One species that uses cryoprotectant is Polistes exclamans (a wasp). In this species, the different levels of cryoprotectant can be used to distinguish between morphologies.

=== Amphibians ===
Cold-adapted arctic frogs, such as wood frogs, and some other ectotherms in polar and subpolar regions naturally produce glucose, but southern brown tree frogs and Arctic salamanders create glycerol in their livers to reduce ice formation.

When glucose is used as a cryoprotectant by arctic frogs, massive amounts of glucose are released at low temperature and a special form of insulin allows for this extra glucose to enter the cells. When the frog rewarms during spring, the extra glucose must be rapidly eliminated, but stored.

== Food preservation ==
Cryoprotectants are also used to preserve foods. These compounds are typically sugars that are inexpensive and do not pose any toxicity concerns. For example, many (raw) frozen chicken products contain a sucrose and sodium phosphates solution in water.

== Common ==
- DMSO
- Ethylene glycol
- Glycerol
- 2-Methyl-2,4-pentanediol (MPD)
- Propylene glycol
- Sucrose
- Trehalose
- Heavy water [7]

== See also ==
- Antifreeze protein
- Cryoconservation of animal genetic resources
- Cryoconservation of plant genetic resources
- Cryopreservation
- Cryostasis (clathrate hydrates)
- List of emerging technologies
- Lyophilization
