= Cryobiology =

Study of effects of extreme low temperatures on life

Cryobiology is the branch of biology that studies the effects of low temperatures on living things within Earth's cryosphere or in science. The word cryobiology is derived from the Greek words κρῧος [kryos], "cold", βίος [bios], "life", and λόγος [logos], "word". In practice, cryobiology is the study of biological material or systems at temperatures below normal. Materials or systems studied may include proteins, cells, tissues, organs, or whole organisms. Temperatures may range from moderately hypothermic conditions to cryogenic temperatures.

== Areas of study ==
At least six major areas of cryobiology can be identified: 1) study of cold-adaptation of microorganisms, plants (cold hardiness), and animals, both invertebrates and vertebrates (including hibernation), 2) cryopreservation of cells, tissues, gametes, and embryos of animal and human origin for (medical) purposes of long-term storage by cooling to temperatures below the freezing point of water. This usually requires the addition of substances which protect the cells during freezing and thawing (cryoprotectants), 3) preservation of organs under hypothermic conditions for transplantation, 4) lyophilization (freeze-drying) of pharmaceuticals, 5) cryosurgery, a (minimally) invasive approach for the destruction of unhealthy tissue using cryogenic gases/fluids, and 6) physics of supercooling, ice nucleation/growth and mechanical engineering aspects of heat transfer during cooling and warming, as applied to biological systems. Cryobiology would include cryonics, the low temperature preservation of humans and mammals with the intention of future revival, although this is not part of mainstream cryobiology, depending heavily on speculative technology yet to be invented. Several of these areas of study rely on cryogenics, the branch of physics and engineering that studies the production and use of very low temperatures.

== Cryopreservation in nature ==
Many living organisms are able to tolerate prolonged periods of time at temperatures below the freezing point of water. Most living organisms accumulate cryoprotectants such as antinucleating proteins, polyols, and glucose to protect themselves against frost damage by sharp ice crystals. Most plants, in particular, can safely reach temperatures of −4 °C to −12 °C.

=== Bacteria ===
Three species of bacteria, Carnobacterium pleistocenium, Chryseobacterium greenlandensis, and Herminiimonas glaciei, have reportedly been revived after surviving for thousands of years frozen in ice. Certain bacteria, notably Pseudomonas syringae, produce specialized proteins that serve as potent ice nucleators, which they use to force ice formation on the surface of various fruits and plants at about −2 °C. The freezing causes injuries in the epithelia and makes the nutrients in the underlying plant tissues available to the bacteria. Listeria grows slowly in temperatures as low as -1.5 °C and persists for some time in frozen foods.

=== Plants ===
Many plants undergo a process called hardening which allows them to survive temperatures below 0 °C for weeks to months. Cryobiology of plants explores the cellular and molecular adaptations plants develop to survive subzero temperatures, such as antifreeze proteins (AFP) and changes in membrane composition. Cryopreservation is a critical technique in plant cryobiology, used for the long-term storage of genetic material and the preservation of endangered species by maintaining plant tissues or seeds in liquid nitrogen. Research in this area aims to enhance agricultural productivity in cold climates, improve the storage of plant genetic resources, and understand the impacts of climate change on plant biodiversity.

=== Animals ===
==== Invertebrates ====
Nematodes that survive below 0 °C include Trichostrongylus colubriformis and Panagrolaimus davidi. Cockroach nymphs (Periplaneta japonica) survive short periods of freezing at -6 to -8 °C. The red flat bark beetle (Cucujus clavipes) can survive after being frozen to -150 °C. The fungus gnat Exechia nugatoria can survive after being frozen to -50 °C, by a unique mechanism whereby ice crystals form in the body but not the head. Another freeze-tolerant beetle is Upis ceramboides. See insect winter ecology and antifreeze protein. Another invertebrate that is briefly tolerant to temperatures down to -273 °C is the tardigrade.

The larvae of Haemonchus contortus, a nematode, can survive 44 weeks frozen at -196 °C.

==== Vertebrates ====
For the wood frog (Rana sylvatica), in the winter, as much as 45% of its body may freeze and turn to ice. "Ice crystals form beneath the skin and become interspersed among the body's skeletal muscles. During the freeze, the frog's breathing, blood flow, and heartbeat cease. Freezing is made possible by specialized proteins and glucose, which prevent intracellular freezing and dehydration." The wood frog can survive up to 11 days frozen at -4 °C.

Other vertebrates that survive at body temperatures below 0 °C include painted turtles (Chrysemys picta), gray tree frogs (Hyla versicolor), moor frogs (Rana arvalis), box turtles (Terrapene carolina - 48 hours at -2 °C), spring peeper (Pseudacris crucifer), garter snakes (Thamnophis sirtalis- 24 hours at -1.5 °C), the chorus frog (Pseudacris triseriata), Siberian salamander (Salamandrella keyserlingii - 24 hours at -15.3 °C), European common lizard (Lacerta vivipara) and Antarctic fish such as Pagothenia borchgrevinki. Antifreeze proteins cloned from such fish have been used to confer frost-resistance on transgenic plants.

Hibernating Arctic ground squirrels may have abdominal temperatures as low as −2.9 °C (26.8 °F), maintaining subzero abdominal temperatures for more than three weeks at a time, although the temperatures at the head and neck remain at 0 °C or above.

== Applied cryobiology ==
=== Historical background ===
Cryobiology history can be traced back to antiquity. As early as in 2500 BC, low temperatures were used in Egypt in medicine. The use of cold was recommended by Hippocrates to stop bleeding and swelling. With the emergence of modern science, Robert Boyle studied the effects of low temperatures on animals.

In 1949, bull semen was cryopreserved for the first time by a team of scientists led by Christopher Polge. This led to a much wider use of cryopreservation today, with many organs, tissues and cells routinely stored at low temperatures. Large organs such as hearts are usually stored and transported, for short times only, at cool but not freezing temperatures for transplantation. Cell suspensions (like blood and semen) and thin tissue sections can sometimes be stored almost indefinitely in liquid nitrogen temperature (cryopreservation). Human sperm, eggs, and embryos are routinely stored in fertility research and treatments. Controlled-rate and slow freezing are well established techniques pioneered in the early 1970s which enabled the first human embryo frozen birth (Zoe Leyland) in 1984. Since then, machines that freeze biological samples using programmable steps, or controlled rates, have been used all over the world for human, animal, and cell biology – 'freezing down' a sample to better preserve it for eventual thawing, before it is deep frozen, or cryopreserved, in liquid nitrogen. Such machines are used for freezing oocytes, skin, blood products, embryo, sperm, stem cells, and general tissue preservation in hospitals, veterinary practices, and research labs. The number of live births from 'slow frozen' embryos is some 300,000 to 400,000 or 20% of the estimated 3 million in vitro fertilized births. Dr Christopher Chen, Australia, reported the world’s first pregnancy using slow-frozen oocytes from a British controlled-rate freezer in 1986.

Cryosurgery (intended and controlled tissue destruction by ice formation) was carried out by James Arnott in 1845 in an operation on a patient with cancer.

=== Preservation techniques ===
Cryobiology as an applied science is primarily concerned with low-temperature preservation. Hypothermic storage is typically above 0 °C but below normothermic (32 °C to 37 °C) mammalian temperatures. Storage by cryopreservation, on the other hand, will be in the −80 to −196 °C temperature range. Organs, and tissues are more frequently the objects of hypothermic storage, whereas single cells have been the most common objects cryopreserved.

A rule of thumb in hypothermic storage is that every 10 °C reduction in temperature is accompanied by a 50% decrease in oxygen consumption. Although hibernating animals have adapted mechanisms to avoid metabolic imbalances associated with hypothermia, hypothermic organs, and tissues being maintained for transplantation require special preservation solutions to counter acidosis, depressed sodium pump activity. and increased intracellular calcium. Special organ preservation solutions such as Viaspan (University of Wisconsin solution), HTK, and Celsior have been designed for this purpose. These solutions also contain ingredients to minimize damage by free radicals, prevent edema, compensate for ATP loss, etc.

Cryopreservation of cells is guided by the "two-factor hypothesis" of American cryobiologist Peter Mazur, which states that excessively rapid cooling kills cells by intracellular ice formation and excessively slow cooling kills cells by either electrolyte toxicity or mechanical crushing. During slow cooling, ice forms extracellularly, causing water to osmotically leave cells, thereby dehydrating them. Intracellular ice can be much more damaging than extracellular ice.

For red blood cells, the optimum cooling rate is very rapid (nearly 100 °C per second), whereas for stem cells the optimum cooling rate is very slow (1 °C per minute). Cryoprotectants, such as dimethyl sulfoxide and glycerol, are used to protect cells from freezing. A variety of cell types are protected by 10% dimethyl sulfoxide. Cryobiologists attempt to optimize cryoprotectant concentration (minimizing both ice formation and toxicity) and cooling rate. Cells may be cooled at an optimum rate to a temperature between −30 and −40 °C before being plunged into liquid nitrogen.

Slow cooling methods rely on the fact that cells contain few nucleating agents, but contain naturally occurring vitrifying substances that can prevent ice formation in cells that have been moderately dehydrated. Some cryobiologists are seeking mixtures of cryoprotectants for full vitrification (zero ice formation) in preservation of cells, tissues, and organs. Vitrification methods pose a challenge in the requirement to search for cryoprotectant mixtures that can minimize toxicity.

=== In humans ===
Human gametes and two-, four- and eight-cell embryos can survive cryopreservation at -196 °C for 10 years under well-controlled laboratory conditions.

Cryopreservation in humans with regards to infertility involves preservation of embryos, sperm, or oocytes via freezing. Conception, in vitro, is attempted when the sperm is thawed and introduced to the 'fresh' eggs, the frozen eggs are thawed and sperm is placed with the eggs and together they are placed back into the uterus or a frozen embryo is introduced to the uterus. Vitrification has flaws and is not as reliable or proven as freezing fertilized sperm, eggs, or embryos as traditional slow freezing methods because eggs alone are extremely sensitive to temperature. Many researchers are also freezing ovarian tissue in conjunction with the eggs in hopes that the ovarian tissue can be transplanted back into the uterus, stimulating normal ovulation cycles. In 2004, Donnez of Louvain in Belgium reported the first successful ovarian birth from frozen ovarian tissue. In 1997, samples of ovarian cortex were taken from a woman with Hodgkin's lymphoma and cryopreserved in a (Planer, UK) controlled-rate freezer and then stored in liquid nitrogen. Chemotherapy was initiated after the patient had premature ovarian failure. In 2003, after freeze-thawing, orthotopic autotransplantation of ovarian cortical tissue was done by laparoscopy and after five months, reimplantation signs indicated recovery of regular ovulatory cycles. Eleven months after reimplantation, a viable intrauterine pregnancy was confirmed, which resulted in the first such live birth – a girl named Tamara.

Therapeutic hypothermia, e.g. during heart surgery on a "cold" heart (generated by cold perfusion without any ice formation) allows for much longer operations and improves recovery rates for patients.

== Scientific societies ==
The Society for Cryobiology was founded in 1964 to bring together those from the biological, medical, and physical sciences who have a common interest in the effects of low temperatures on biological systems. As of 2007, the Society for Cryobiology had about 280 members from around the world, and one-half of them are US-based. The purpose of the Society is to promote scientific research in low temperature biology, to improve scientific understanding in this field, and to disseminate and apply this knowledge to the benefit of mankind. The Society requires of all its members the highest ethical and scientific standards in the performance of their professional activities. According to the Society's bylaws, membership may be refused to applicants whose conduct is deemed detrimental to the Society; in 1982, the bylaws were amended explicitly to exclude "any practice or application of freezing deceased persons in the anticipation of their reanimation", over the objections of some members who were cryonicists, such as Jerry Leaf. The Society organizes an annual scientific meeting dedicated to all aspects of low-temperature biology. This international meeting offers opportunities for presentation and discussion of the most up-to-date research in cryobiology, as well as reviewing specific aspects through symposia and workshops. Members are also kept informed of news and forthcoming meetings through the Society newsletter, News Notes. The 2011–2012 president of the Society for Cryobiology was John H. Crowe.

The Society for Low Temperature Biology was founded in 1964 and became a registered charity in 2003 with the purpose of promoting research into the effects of low temperatures on all types of organisms and their constituent cells, tissues, and organs. As of 2006, the society had around 130 (mostly British and European) members and holds at least one annual general meeting. The program usually includes both a symposium on a topical subject and a session of free communications on any aspect of low-temperature biology. Recent symposia have included long-term stability, preservation of aquatic organisms, cryopreservation of embryos and gametes, preservation of plants, low-temperature microscopy, vitrification (glass formation of aqueous systems during cooling), freeze drying and tissue banking. Members are informed through the Society Newsletter, which is presently published three times a year.

== Journals ==
Cryobiology (publisher: Elsevier) is the foremost scientific publication in this area, with about 60 refereed contributions published each year. Articles concern any aspect of low-temperature biology and medicine (e.g. freezing, freeze-drying, hibernation, cold tolerance and adaptation, cryoprotective compounds, medical applications of reduced temperature, cryosurgery, hypothermia, and perfusion of organs).

Cryo Letters is an independent UK-based rapid communication journal which publishes papers on the effects produced by low temperatures on a wide variety of biophysical and biological processes, or studies involving low-temperature techniques in the investigation of biological and ecological topics.

Biopreservation and Biobanking (formerly Cell Preservation Technology) is a peer-reviewed quarterly scientific journal published by Mary Ann Liebert, Inc. dedicated to the diverse spectrum of preservation technologies including cryopreservation, dry-state (anhydrobiosis), and glassy-state and hypothermic maintenance. Cell Preservation Technology has been renamed Biopreservation and Biobanking and is the official journal of International Society for Biological and Environmental Repositories.

Problems of Cryobiology and Cryomedicine (formerly 'Kriobiologiya' (1985-1990) and 'Problems of Cryobiology'(1991-2012) ) published by Institute for Problems of Cryobiology and Cryomedicine. The journal covers all topics related to low temperature biology, medicine and engineering.

== See also ==
- Cryptobiosis
