= Transhumanism =

Philosophical movement

Transhumanism is an intellectual and cultural movement that advocates using existing, emerging, and speculative technologies to enhance humans beyond current natural limitations, particularly by extending longevity and improving cognition, health, and well-being. It draws on developments in science, technology, engineering, and mathematics (STEM), as well as longstanding themes in science fiction.

Transhumanism explores the ramifications, promises, and potential dangers associated with human enhancement technologies. Key areas of inquiry include nanotechnology, biotechnology, information technology, and cognitive science (NBIC). Transhumanists envision that the convergence of advanced human enhancement technologies could eventually enable humans to become "posthumans", beings whose capacities exceed those of present-day humans. Some transhumanists focus on conceiving strategies for reducing existential risks to humanity, including those posed by artificial superintelligence, asteroid impacts, gray goo, nuclear warfare, pandemics, and societal collapse.

Biologist Julian Huxley popularized the term "transhumanism" in a 1957 essay. He defined it as the idea that humanity can consciously transcend its limitations through reason, science, and technology, collectively realizing untapped human potential while remaining fundamentally human. Its contemporary meaning emerged during the late 20th century through the work of futurists and philosophers, including Fereidoun M. Esfandiary (FM-2030), who described a human who adopts technologies, lifestyles, and worldviews as "transhuman" in the sense of being "transitional" to posthumanity, and Max More, who formulated transhumanism as a class of philosophies beginning in the late 1980s and early 1990s. Since then, transhumanism has developed into an international intellectual and cultural movement encompassing a diverse range of philosophical perspectives and organizations. The movement has attracted both support and criticism from a wide range of philosophical, religious, ethical, and political perspectives. Some critics argue that transhumanism represents a revival of eugenic ideology under the banner of technological progress and individual choice.

== History ==
=== Precursors of transhumanism ===
According to Nick Bostrom, transcendentalist impulses have been expressed at least as far back as the quest for immortality in the Epic of Gilgamesh, as well as in historical quests for the Fountain of Youth, the Elixir of Life, and other efforts to stave off aging and death.

Transhumanists draw upon and claim continuity from intellectual and cultural traditions such as the ancient philosophy of Aristotle or the scientific tradition of Roger Bacon. In his Divine Comedy, Dante coined the word trasumanar meaning "to transcend human nature, to pass beyond human nature" in the first canto of Paradiso.

The interweaving of transhumanist aspirations with the scientific imagination can be seen in the works of some precursors of Enlightenment such as Francis Bacon. One of the early precursors to transhumanist ideas is René Descartes's Discourse on Method (1637), in which Descartes envisions a new kind of medicine that can grant both physical immortality and stronger minds.

In his first edition of Political Justice (1793), William Godwin included arguments favoring the possibility of "earthly immortality" (what would now be called physical immortality). Godwin explored the themes of life extension and immortality in his gothic novel St. Leon, which became popular (and notorious) at the time of its publication in 1799, but is now mostly forgotten. St. Leon may have inspired his daughter Mary Shelley's novel Frankenstein.

There is debate about whether the philosophy of Friedrich Nietzsche can be considered an influence on transhumanism, despite its exaltation of the Übermensch (superhuman), due to its emphasis on self-actualization rather than technological transformation. The transhumanist philosophies of More and Sorgner have been influenced strongly by Nietzschean thinking. By contrast, The Transhumanist Declaration "advocates the well-being of all sentience (whether in artificial intellects, humans, posthumans, or non-human animals)".

The late 19th- to early 20th-century movement known as Russian cosmism, by Russian philosopher N. F. Fyodorov, is noted for anticipating transhumanist ideas. In 1966, FM-2030 (formerly F. M. Esfandiary), a futurist who taught "new concepts of the human" at The New School, in New York City, began to identify people who adopt technologies, lifestyles and worldviews transitional to posthumanity as "transhuman".

=== Early transhumanist thinking ===
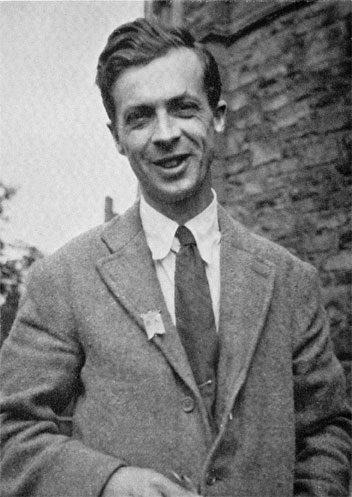
Julian Huxley, the biologist who popularised the term transhumanism in an influential 1957 essay

Fundamental ideas of transhumanism were first advanced in 1923 by the British geneticist J. B. S. Haldane in his essay Daedalus: Science and the Future, which predicted that great benefits would come from the application of advanced sciences to human biology—and that every such advance would first appear to someone as blasphemy or perversion, "indecent and unnatural". In particular, he was interested in the development of the science of ectogenesis (creating and sustaining life in an artificial environment), eugenics, and the application of genetics to improve human characteristics such as health and intelligence.

His article inspired academic and popular interest. J. D. Bernal, a crystallographer at Cambridge, wrote The World, the Flesh and the Devil in 1929, in which he speculated on the prospects of space colonization and radical changes to human bodies and intelligence through bionic implants and cognitive enhancement. These ideas have been common transhumanist themes ever since.

The biologist Julian Huxley is generally regarded as the founder of transhumanism after using the term for the title of an influential 1957 article (though the term came from a 1940 paper by the Canadian philosopher William Douw Lighthall.) Huxley describes transhumanism in these terms:

Up till now human life has generally been, as Hobbes described it, "nasty, brutish and short"; the great majority of human beings (if they have not already died young) have been afflicted with misery… we can justifiably hold the belief that these lands of possibility exist, and that the present limitations and miserable frustrations of our existence could be in large measure surmounted… The human species can, if it wishes, transcend itself—not just sporadically, an individual here in one way, an individual there in another way, but in its entirety, as humanity.

Huxley's definition differs, albeit not substantially, from the one commonly in use since the 1980s. The ideas raised by these thinkers were explored in the science fiction of the 1960s, notably in Arthur C. Clarke's 2001: A Space Odyssey, in which an alien artifact grants transcendent power to its wielder.

Japanese Metabolist architects produced a manifesto in 1960 which outlined goals to "encourage active metabolic development of our society" through design and technology. In the Material and Man section of the manifesto, Noboru Kawazoe suggests that:

After several decades, with the rapid progress of communication technology, every one will have a "brain wave receiver" in his ear, which conveys directly and exactly what other people think about him and vice versa. What I think will be known by all the people. There is no more individual consciousness, only the will of mankind as a whole.

=== Artificial intelligence and the technological singularity ===
The concept of the technological singularity, or the ultra-rapid advent of superhuman intelligence, was first proposed by the British cryptologist I. J. Good in 1965:

Let an ultraintelligent machine be defined as a machine that can far surpass all the intellectual activities of any man however clever. Since the design of machines is one of these intellectual activities, an ultraintelligent machine could design even better machines; there would then unquestionably be an "intelligence explosion," and the intelligence of man would be left far behind. Thus the first ultraintelligent machine is the last invention that man need ever make.

Computer scientist Marvin Minsky wrote on relationships between human and artificial intelligence beginning in the 1960s. Over the succeeding decades, this field continued to generate influential thinkers, such as Hans Moravec and Ray Kurzweil, who oscillated between the technical arena and futuristic speculations in the transhumanist vein. An identifiable transhumanist movement began to coalesce in the last decades of the 20th century. Robert Ettinger, whose 1964 Prospect of Immortality founded the cryonics movement, contributed to the conceptualization of "transhumanity" with his 1972 Man into Superman. FM-2030 published the Upwingers Manifesto in 1973.

=== Growth of transhumanism ===
The first self-described transhumanists met formally in the early 1980s at the University of California, Los Angeles, which became the main center of transhumanist thought. Here, FM-2030 lectured on his "Third Way" futurist ideology. At the EZTV Media venue, frequented by transhumanists and other futurists, Natasha Vita-More presented Breaking Away, her 1980 experimental film with the theme of humans breaking away from their biological limitations and the Earth's gravity as they head into space. FM-2030 and Vita-More soon began holding gatherings for transhumanists in Los Angeles, which included students from FM-2030's courses and audiences from Vita-More's artistic productions. In 1982, Vita-More authored the Transhumanist Arts Statement and in 1988 she produced the cable TV show TransCentury Update on transhumanity, a program that reached over 100,000 viewers.

In 1986, Eric Drexler published Engines of Creation: The Coming Era of Nanotechnology, which discussed the prospects for nanotechnology and molecular assemblers, and founded the Foresight Institute. As the first nonprofit organization to research, advocate for, and perform cryonics, the Southern California offices of the Alcor Life Extension Foundation became a center for futurists. In 1988, the first issue of Extropy Magazine was published by Max More and Tom Morrow. In 1990, More, a strategic philosopher, created his own particular transhumanist doctrine, which took the form of the Principles of Extropy, and laid the foundation of modern transhumanism by giving it a new definition:

Transhumanism is a class of philosophies that seek to guide us towards a posthuman condition. Transhumanism shares many elements of humanism, including a respect for reason and science, a commitment to progress, and a valuing of human (or transhuman) existence in this life. [...] Transhumanism differs from humanism in recognizing and anticipating the radical alterations in the nature and possibilities of our lives resulting from various sciences and technologies [...]

In 1992, More and Morrow founded the Extropy Institute, a catalyst for networking futurists and brainstorming new memeplexes by organizing a series of conferences and, more importantly, providing a mailing list, which exposed many to transhumanist views for the first time during the rise of cyberculture and the cyberdelic counterculture. In 1998, philosophers Nick Bostrom and David Pearce founded the World Transhumanist Association (WTA), an international non-governmental organization working toward the recognition of transhumanism as a legitimate subject of scientific inquiry and public policy. In 2002, the WTA modified and adopted The Transhumanist Declaration. The Transhumanist FAQ, prepared by the WTA (later Humanity+), gave two formal definitions for transhumanism:

1. The intellectual and cultural movement that affirms the possibility and desirability of fundamentally improving the human condition through applied reason, especially by developing and making widely available technologies to eliminate aging and to greatly enhance human intellectual, physical, and psychological capacities.
2. The study of the ramifications, promises, and potential dangers of technologies that will enable us to overcome fundamental human limitations, and the related study of the ethical matters involved in developing and using such technologies.

In possible contrast with other transhumanist organizations, WTA officials considered that social forces could undermine their futurist visions and needed to be addressed. A particular concern is equal access to human enhancement technologies across classes and borders. In 2006, a political struggle within the transhumanist movement between the libertarian right and the liberal left resulted in a more centre-leftward positioning of the WTA under its former executive director James Hughes. In 2006, the board of directors of the Extropy Institute ceased operations of the organization, saying that its mission was "essentially completed". This left the World Transhumanist Association as the leading international transhumanist organization. In 2008, as part of a rebranding effort, the WTA changed its name to "Humanity+". In 2012, the transhumanist Longevity Party had been initiated as an international union of people who promote the development of scientific and technological means to significant life extension that now has more than 30 national organisations throughout the world.

The Mormon Transhumanist Association was founded in 2006. By 2012, it had hundreds of members.

The first transhumanist elected member of a parliament was Giuseppe Vatinno, in 2012 in Italy.

In 2017, Penn State University Press, in cooperation with philosopher Stefan Lorenz Sorgner and sociologist James Hughes, established the Journal of Posthuman Studies as the first academic journal explicitly dedicated to the posthuman, with the goal of clarifying the notions of posthumanism and transhumanism, as well as comparing and contrasting both.

== Theory ==
It is a matter of debate whether transhumanism is a branch of posthumanism and how this philosophical movement should be conceptualised with regard to transhumanism. Transhumanism is often referred to as a variant or activist form of posthumanism by its conservative, Christian and progressive critics.

A common feature of transhumanism and philosophical posthumanism is the future vision of a new intelligent species, into which humanity will evolve and which eventually will supplement or supersede it. Transhumanism stresses the evolutionary perspective, including sometimes the creation of a highly intelligent animal species by way of cognitive enhancement (i.e. biological uplift), but clings to a "posthuman future" as the final goal of participant evolution.

Nevertheless, the idea of creating intelligent artificial beings (proposed, for example, by roboticist Hans Moravec) has influenced transhumanism. Moravec's ideas and transhumanism have also been characterised as a "complacent" or "apocalyptic" variant of posthumanism and contrasted with "cultural posthumanism" in humanities and the arts. While such a "cultural posthumanism" would offer resources for rethinking the relationships between humans and increasingly sophisticated machines, transhumanism and similar posthumanisms are, in this view, not abandoning obsolete concepts of the "autonomous liberal subject", but are expanding its "prerogatives" into the realm of the posthuman. Transhumanist self-characterisations as a continuation of humanism and Enlightenment thinking correspond with this view.

Some secular humanists conceive transhumanism as an offspring of the humanist freethought movement and argue that transhumanists differ from the humanist mainstream by having a specific focus on technological approaches to resolving human concerns (i.e. technocentrism) and on the issue of mortality. Other progressives have argued that posthumanism, in its philosophical or activist forms, amounts to a shift away from concerns about social justice, from the reform of human institutions and from other Enlightenment preoccupations, toward narcissistic longings to transcend the human body in quest of more exquisite ways of being.

The philosophy of transhumanism is closely related to technoself studies, an interdisciplinary domain of scholarly research dealing with all aspects of human identity in a technological society and focusing on the changing nature of relationships between humans and technology.

=== Aims ===
You awake one morning to find your brain has another lobe functioning. Invisible, this auxiliary lobe answers your questions with information beyond the realm of your own memory, suggests plausible courses of action, and asks questions that help bring out relevant facts. You quickly come to rely on the new lobe so much that you stop wondering how it works. You just use it. This is the dream of artificial intelligence.

— Byte, April 1985

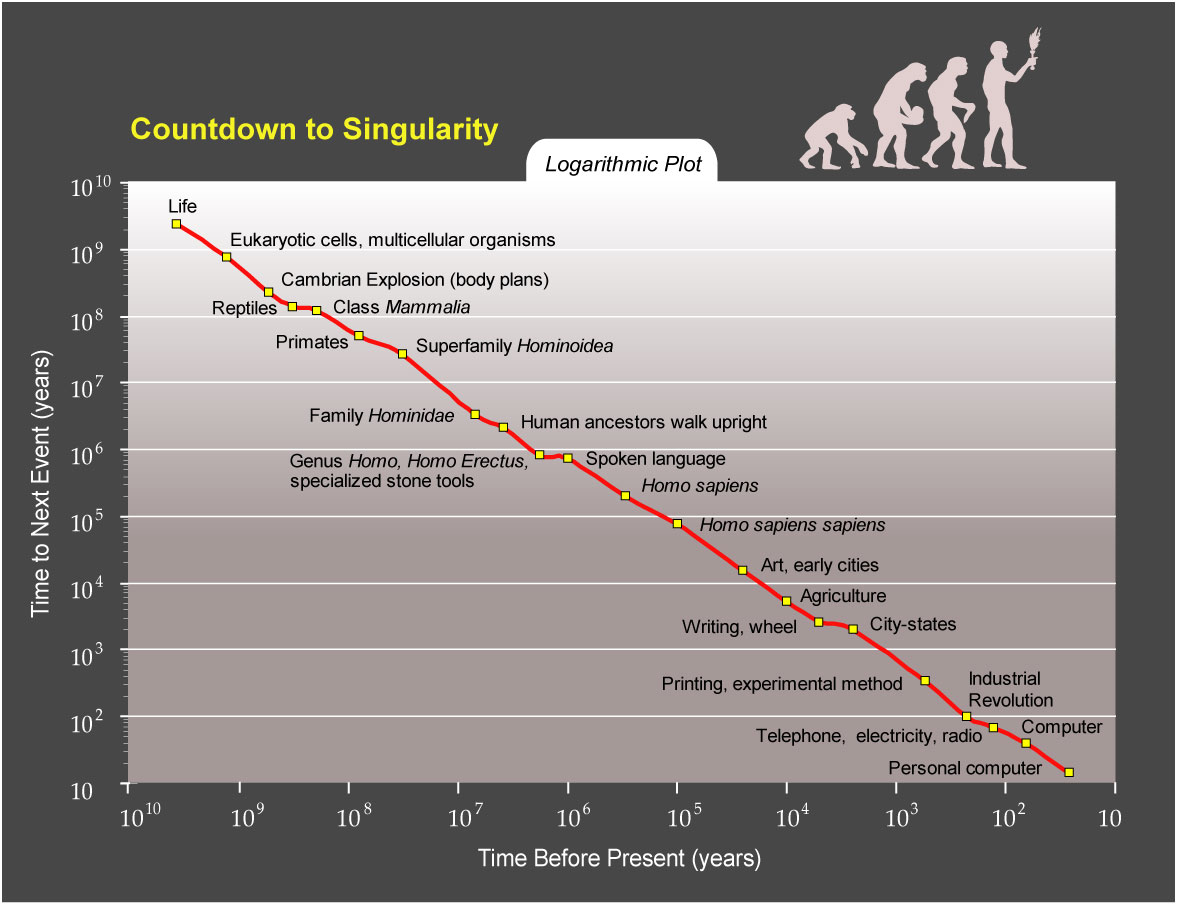
Ray Kurzweil believes that a countdown to when "human life will be irreversibly transformed" can be made through plotting major world events on a graph.

While many transhumanist theorists and advocates seek to apply reason, science and technology to reduce poverty, disease, disability, and malnutrition around the globe, transhumanism is distinctive in its particular focus on the applications of technologies to the improvement of human bodies at the individual level. Many transhumanists actively assess the potential for future technologies and innovative social systems to improve the quality of all life, while seeking to make the material reality of the human condition fulfill the promise of legal and political equality by eliminating congenital mental and physical barriers.

Transhumanist philosophers argue that there not only exists a perfectionist ethical imperative for humans to strive for progress and improvement of the human condition, but that it is possible and desirable for humanity to enter a transhuman phase of existence in which humans enhance themselves beyond what is naturally human. In such a phase, natural evolution would be replaced with deliberate participatory or directed evolution.

Some theorists such as Ray Kurzweil think that the pace of technological innovation is accelerating and that the next 50 years may yield not only radical technological advances, but possibly a technological singularity, which may fundamentally change the nature of human beings. Transhumanists who foresee this massive technological change generally maintain that it is desirable, but some are concerned about the dangers of extremely rapid technological change and propose options for ensuring that advanced technology is used responsibly. For example, Bostrom has written extensively on existential risks to humanity's future welfare, including ones that emerging technologies could create. In contrast, some proponents of transhumanism view it as essential to humanity's survival. For instance, Stephen Hawking points out that the "external transmission" phase of human evolution, where knowledge production and knowledge management is more important than transmission of information via evolution, may be the point at which human civilization becomes unstable and self-destructs, one of Hawking's explanations for the Fermi paradox. To counter this, Hawking emphasizes either self-design of the human genome or mechanical enhancement (e.g., brain-computer interface) to enhance human intelligence and reduce aggression, without which he implies human civilization may be too stupid collectively to survive an increasingly unstable system, resulting in societal collapse.

While many people believe that all transhumanists are striving for immortality, that is not necessarily true. Hank Pellissier, managing director of the Institute for Ethics and Emerging Technologies (2011–2012), surveyed transhumanists. He found that, of the 818 respondents, 23.8% did not want immortality. Some of the reasons argued were boredom, Earth's overpopulation, and the desire "to go to an afterlife".

=== Ethics ===
Transhumanists engage in interdisciplinary approaches to understand and evaluate possibilities for overcoming biological limitations by drawing on futurology and various fields of ethics. Unlike many philosophers, social critics, and activists who morally value preservation of natural systems, transhumanists see the concept of the specifically natural as problematically nebulous at best and an obstacle to progress at worst. In keeping with this, many prominent transhumanist advocates, such as Dan Agin, call transhumanism's critics, on the political right and left jointly, "bioconservatives" or "bioluddites", the latter term alluding to the 19th-century anti-industrialisation social movement that opposed the replacement of human manual labourers by machines.

A belief of counter-transhumanism is that transhumanism can cause unfair human enhancement in many areas of life, but specifically on the social plane. This can be compared to steroid use, where athletes who use steroids in sports have an advantage over those who do not. The same disparity may happen when people have certain neural implants that give them an advantage in the workplace and in education. Additionally, according to M.J. McNamee and S.D. Edwards, many fear that the improvements afforded by a specific, privileged section of society will lead to a division of the human species into two different species. The idea of two human species, one at a great physical and economic advantage over with the other, is troublesome at best. One may be incapable of breeding with the other, and may by consequence of lower physical health and ability, be considered of a lower moral standing than the other.

Nick Bostrom has said that transhumanism advocates for the wellbeing of all sentient beings, including non-human animals, extraterrestrials, and artificial forms of life. This view is reiterated by David Pearce, who advocates the use of biotechnology to eradicate suffering in all sentient beings.

=== Currents ===
There is a variety of opinions within transhumanist thought. Many of the leading transhumanist thinkers hold views that are under constant revision and development. Some distinctive currents of transhumanism are identified and listed here in alphabetical order:

- Abolitionism, the concept of using biotechnology to eradicate suffering in all sentient beings.
- Democratic transhumanism, a political ideology synthesizing liberal democracy, social democracy, radical democracy and transhumanism.
- Equalism, a socioeconomic theory based upon the idea that emerging technologies will put an end to social stratification through even distribution of resources in the technological singularity era.
- Extropianism, an early school of transhumanist thought characterized by a set of principles advocating a proactive approach to human evolution.
- Immortalism, a moral ideology based upon the belief that radical life extension and technological immortality is possible and desirable, and advocating research and development to ensure its realization.
- Libertarian transhumanism, a political ideology synthesizing libertarianism and transhumanism.
- Postgenderism, a social philosophy which seeks the voluntary elimination of gender in the human species through the application of advanced biotechnology and assisted reproductive technologies.
- Postpoliticism, a transhumanist political proposal that aims to create a "postdemocratic state" based on reason and free access of enhancement technologies to people.
- Singularitarianism, a moral ideology based upon the belief that a technological singularity is possible, and advocating deliberate action to effect it and ensure its safety.
- Technogaianism, an ecological ideology based upon the belief that emerging technologies can help restore Earth's environment and that developing safe, clean, alternative technology should therefore be an important goal of environmentalists.

=== Spirituality ===
Although many transhumanists are atheists, agnostics, or secular humanists, some have religious or spiritual views. Despite the prevailing secular attitude, some transhumanists pursue hopes traditionally espoused by religions, such as immortality, while several controversial new religious movements from the late 20th century, such as Raëlism, explicitly embrace the transhumanist goal to transform the human condition by using technology to alter the mind and body. But most thinkers associated with transhumanism focus on the practical goals of using technology to help achieve longer and healthier lives, while speculating that future understanding of neurotheology and the application of neurotechnology will enable humans to gain greater control of altered states of consciousness, which were commonly interpreted as spiritual experiences, and thus achieve more profound self-knowledge. Transhumanist Buddhists have sought to explore areas of agreement between various types of Buddhism and Buddhist-derived meditation and mind-expanding neurotechnologies. They have been criticised for appropriating mindfulness as a tool for transcending humanness.

Some transhumanists believe the human mind and computer hardware are compatible, with the theoretical implication that human consciousness may someday be transferred to alternative media (a technique commonly known as mind uploading). One extreme formulation of this idea that interests some transhumanists is Christian cosmologist Frank Tipler's proposal of the Omega Point. Drawing on ideas in digitalism, Tipler has advanced the notion that the collapse of the universe billions of years hence could create the conditions for the perpetuation of humanity in a simulated reality within a megacomputer and thus achieve a form of "posthuman godhood". Before Tipler, the term Omega Point was used by Pierre Teilhard de Chardin, a paleontologist and Jesuit theologian who saw an evolutionary telos in the development of an encompassing noosphere, a global consciousness.

Some Christian thinkers see mind uploading as a denigration of the human body characteristic of gnostic manichaean belief. Non-Christian and secular commentators have also described transhumanism and its presumed intellectual progenitors as neo-gnostic.

The first dialogue between transhumanism and faith was a one-day conference at the University of Toronto in 2004. Religious critics faulted transhumanism for offering no eternal truths or relationship with the divine. They commented that a philosophy bereft of these beliefs leaves humanity adrift in a foggy sea of postmodern cynicism and anomie. Transhumanists responded that such criticisms reflect a failure to look at the actual content of transhumanist philosophy, which is rooted in optimistic, idealistic attitudes that trace back to the Enlightenment. After this dialogue, William Sims Bainbridge, a sociologist of religion, conducted a pilot study, published in the Journal of Evolution and Technology, suggesting that religious attitudes negatively correlated with acceptance of transhumanist ideas and indicating that people with highly religious worldviews tended to perceive transhumanism as a direct, competitive (though ultimately futile) affront to their beliefs.

Since 2006, the Mormon Transhumanist Association has sponsored conferences and lectures on the intersection of technology and religion. The Christian Transhumanist Association was established in 2014.

Since 2009, the American Academy of Religion has held a "Transhumanism and Religion" consultation during its annual meeting, where scholars of religious studies seek to identify and critically evaluate implicit religious beliefs that might underlie transhumanist claims and assumptions; consider how transhumanism challenges religious traditions to develop their own ideas of the human future, in particular the prospect of human transformation, by technological or other means; and critically and constructively assess an envisioned future with greater confidence in nanotechnology, robotics, and information technology to achieve virtual immortality and create a superior posthuman species.

The physicist and transhumanist thinker Giulio Prisco writes, "cosmist religions based on science might be our best protection from reckless pursuit of superintelligence and other risky technologies." Transhumanist beliefs can be traced to the theories of the Russian mystic and philosopher Nikolai Fyodorov and his best-known supporter, the astronautics pioneer Konstantin Tsiolkovsky.

In the 2020s, the Catholic Church and Holy See addressed the philosophy of transhumanism and posthumanism in documents including Quo vadis, humanitas?, written by the International Theological Commission, and the papal encyclical Magnifica humanitas.

== Practice ==
While some transhumanists such as Ray Kurzweil and Hans Moravec take an abstract and theoretical approach to the perceived benefits of emerging technologies, others have offered specific proposals for modifications to the human body, including heritable ones. Transhumanists are often concerned with methods of enhancing the human nervous system. Though some, such as Kevin Warwick, propose modification of the peripheral nervous system, the brain is considered the common denominator of personhood and is thus a primary focus of transhumanist ambitions.

In fact, Warwick has gone a lot further than merely making a proposal. In 2002 he had a 100 electrode array surgically implanted into the median nerves of his left arm to link his nervous system directly with a computer and thus to also connect with the internet. As a consequence, he carried out a series of experiments. He was able to directly control a robot hand using his neural signals and to feel the force applied by the hand through feedback from the fingertips. He also experienced a form of ultrasonic sensory input and conducted the first purely electronic communication between his own nervous system and that of his wife who also had electrodes implanted.

As proponents of self-improvement and body modification, transhumanists tend to use existing technologies and techniques that supposedly improve cognitive and physical performance, while engaging in routines and lifestyles designed to improve health and longevity. Depending on their age, some transhumanists, such as Kurzweil, express concern that they will not live to reap the benefits of future technologies. However, many have a great interest in life extension strategies and in funding research in cryonics to make the latter a viable option of last resort, rather than remaining an unproven method.

While most transhumanist theory focuses on future technologies and the changes they may bring, many today are already involved in the practice on a very basic level. It is not uncommon for many to receive cosmetic changes to their physical form via cosmetic surgery, even if it is not required for health reasons. Human growth hormones attempt to alter the natural development of shorter children or those who have been born with a physical deficiency. Doctors prescribe medicines such as Ritalin and Adderall to improve cognitive focus, and many people take "lifestyle" drugs such as Viagra, Propecia, and Botox to restore aspects of youthfulness that have been lost in maturity.

Other transhumanists, such as cyborg artist Neil Harbisson, use technologies and techniques to improve their senses and perception of reality. Harbisson's antenna, which is permanently implanted in his skull, allows him to sense colours beyond human perception such as infrareds and ultraviolets.

=== Technologies of interest ===
Transhumanists support the emergence and convergence of technologies including nanotechnology, biotechnology, information technology and cognitive science (NBIC), as well as hypothetical future technologies like simulated reality, artificial intelligence, superintelligence, 3D bioprinting, mind uploading, chemical brain preservation and cryonics. They believe that humans can and should use these technologies to become more than human. Therefore, they support the recognition or protection of cognitive liberty, morphological freedom and procreative liberty as civil liberties, so as to guarantee individuals the choice of using human enhancement technologies on themselves and their children. Some speculate that human enhancement techniques and other emerging technologies may facilitate more radical human enhancement no later than at the midpoint of the 21st century. Kurzweil's book The Singularity is Near and Michio Kaku's book Physics of the Future outline various human enhancement technologies and give insight on how these technologies may impact the human race.

Some reports on the converging technologies and NBIC concepts have criticised their transhumanist orientation and alleged science fictional character. At the same time, research on brain and body alteration technologies has been accelerated under the sponsorship of the U.S. Department of Defense, which is interested in the battlefield advantages they would provide to the supersoldiers of the United States and its allies. There has already been a brain research program to "extend the ability to manage information", while military scientists are now looking at stretching the human capacity for combat to a maximum 168 hours without sleep.

Neuroscientist Anders Sandberg has been practicing on the method of scanning ultra-thin sections of the brain. This method is being used to help better understand the architecture of the brain. It is currently being used on mice. This is the first step towards hypothetically uploading contents of the human brain, including memories and emotions, onto a computer.

== Debate ==
The very notion and prospect of human enhancement and related issues arouse public controversy. Criticisms of transhumanism and its proposals take two main forms: those objecting to the likelihood of transhumanist goals being achieved (practical criticisms) and those objecting to the moral principles or worldview sustaining transhumanist proposals or underlying transhumanism itself (ethical criticisms). Critics and opponents often see transhumanists' goals as posing threats to human values.

The human enhancement debate is, for some, framed by the opposition between strong bioconservatism and transhumanism. The former opposes any form of human enhancement, whereas the latter advocates for all possible human enhancements. Several philosophers whom Cian Brennan calls "biomoderates" (including Allen Buchanan, Nicholas Agar, and Julian Savulescu) are in favour of certain enhancements but reject the transhumanist carte blanche approach.

Transhumanists argue that parents have a moral responsibility called procreative beneficence to make use of these methods, if and when they are shown to be reasonably safe and effective, to have the healthiest children possible. They believe this responsibility is a moral judgment best left to individual conscience, rather than imposed by law, in all but extreme cases. In this context, the emphasis on freedom of choice is called procreative liberty.

Some of the best-known critiques of the transhumanist program are novels and fictional films. These works, despite presenting imagined worlds rather than philosophical analyses, are touchstones for some of the more formal arguments. Various arguments have been made to the effect that a society that adopts human enhancement technologies may come to resemble the dystopia depicted in Aldous Huxley's 1932 novel Brave New World.

Some authors consider humanity already transhuman, because recent medical advances have significantly altered our species. But this has not happened in a conscious and therefore transhumanistic way. From such a perspective, transhumanism is perpetually aspirational: as new technologies become mainstream, the adoption of still unadopted technologies becomes a new shifting goal.

Giuseppe Vattino, a member of Italy's parliament, believes transhumanism will make people "less subject to the whims of nature, such as illness or climate extremes".

=== Feasibility ===
In a 1992 book, sociologist Max Dublin pointed to many past failed predictions of technological progress and argued that modern futurist predictions would prove similarly inaccurate. He also objected to what he saw as scientism, fanaticism and nihilism by a few in advancing transhumanist causes. Dublin also said that historical parallels existed between Millenarian religions and Communist doctrines.

Although generally sympathetic to transhumanism, public health professor Gregory Stock is skeptical of the technical feasibility and mass appeal of the cyborgization of humanity predicted by Kurzweil, Hans Moravec, and Kevin Warwick. He said that, throughout the 21st century, many humans will be deeply integrated into systems of machines, but remain biological. Primary changes to their own form and character would arise not from cyberware, but from the direct manipulation of their genetics, metabolism and biochemistry.

In her 1992 book Science as Salvation, philosopher Mary Midgley traces the notion of achieving immortality by transcendence of the material human body (echoed in the transhumanist tenet of mind uploading) to a group of male scientific thinkers of the early 20th century, including J. B. S. Haldane and members of his circle. She characterizes these ideas as "quasi-scientific dreams and prophesies" involving visions of escape from the body coupled with "self-indulgent, uncontrolled power-fantasies". Her argument focuses on what she perceives as the pseudoscientific speculations and irrational, fear-of-death-driven fantasies of these thinkers, their disregard for laymen and the remoteness of their eschatological visions.

Another critique is aimed mainly at "algeny" (a portmanteau of alchemy and genetics), which Jeremy Rifkin defined as "the upgrading of existing organisms and the design of wholly new ones with the intent of 'perfecting' their performance". It emphasizes the issue of biocomplexity and the unpredictability of attempts to guide the development of products of biological evolution. This argument, elaborated in particular by the biologist Stuart Newman, is based on the recognition that cloning and germline genetic engineering of animals are error-prone and inherently disruptive of embryonic development. Accordingly, so it is argued, it would create unacceptable risks to use such methods on human embryos. Performing experiments, particularly ones with permanent biological consequences, on developing humans would thus be in violation of accepted principles governing research on human subjects (see the 1964 Declaration of Helsinki). Moreover, because improvements in experimental outcomes in one species are not automatically transferable to a new species without further experimentation, it is claimed that there is no ethical route to genetic manipulation of humans at early developmental stages.

As a practical matter, international protocols on human subject research may not present a legal obstacle to attempts by transhumanists and others to improve their offspring by germinal choice technology. According to legal scholar Kirsten Rabe Smolensky, existing laws protect parents who choose to enhance their child's genome from future liability arising from adverse outcomes of the procedure.

Transhumanists and other supporters of human genetic engineering do not dismiss practical concerns out of hand, insofar as there is a high degree of uncertainty about the timelines and likely outcomes of genetic modification experiments in humans. But bioethicist James Hughes suggests that one possible ethical route to the genetic manipulation of humans at early developmental stages is the building of computer models of the human genome, the proteins it specifies and the tissue engineering he argues that it also codes for. With the exponential progress in bioinformatics, Hughes believes that a virtual model of genetic expression in the human body will not be far behind and that it will soon be possible to accelerate approval of genetic modifications by simulating their effects on virtual humans. Public health professor Gregory Stock points to artificial chromosomes as a safer alternative to existing genetic engineering techniques.

Thinkers such as Ray Kurzweil who have defended the likelihood of accelerating change point to a past pattern of exponential increases in humanity's technological capacities.

=== Intrinsic immorality ===
Some argue that, in transhumanist thought, humans attempt to substitute themselves for God. The 2002 Vatican statement Communion and Stewardship: Human Persons Created in the Image of God, says, "changing the genetic identity of man as a human person through the production of an infrahuman being is radically immoral", implying that "man has full right of disposal over his own biological nature". The statement also argues that creation of a superhuman or spiritually superior being is "unthinkable", since true improvement can come only through religious experience and "realizing more fully the image of God". Christian theologians and lay activists of several churches and denominations have expressed similar objections to transhumanism and said that Christians attain in the afterlife what radical transhumanism promises, such as indefinite life extension or the cessation of suffering. In this view, transhumanism is just another in a long series of utopian movements that have sought to create "heaven on earth". On the other hand, religious thinkers allied with transhumanist goals such as the theologians Ronald Cole-Turner and Ted Peters hold that the doctrine of "co-creation" obligates people to use genetic engineering to improve human biology.

Other critics target what they claim to be an instrumental conception of the human body in the writings of Minsky, Moravec, and some other transhumanists. Reflecting a strain of feminist criticism of the transhumanist program, philosopher Susan Bordo points to "contemporary obsessions with slenderness, youth and physical perfection", which she sees as affecting both men and women, but in distinct ways, as "the logical (if extreme) manifestations of anxieties and fantasies fostered by our culture". Some critics question other social implications of the movement's focus on body modification. Political scientist Klaus-Gerd Giesen, in particular, has said that transhumanism's focus on altering the human body represents a logical but tragic consequence of atomized individualism and body commodification within consumer culture.

Bostrom responds that the desire to regain youth, specifically, and transcend the natural limitations of the human body, in general, is pan-cultural and pan-historical, not uniquely tied to 20th-century culture. He argues that the transhumanist program is an attempt to channel that desire into a scientific project on par with the Human Genome Project and achieve humanity's oldest hope, rather than a puerile fantasy or social trend.

=== Loss of human identity ===
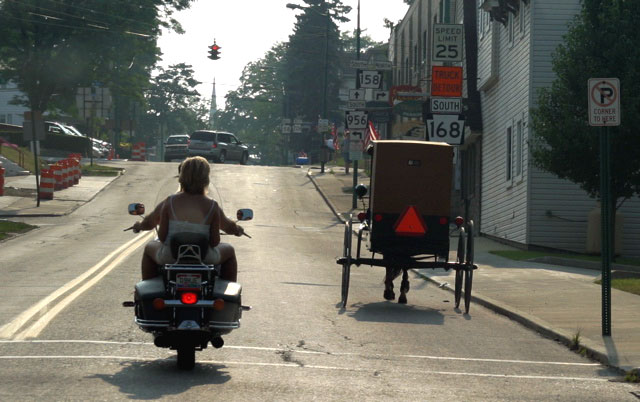
In the U.S., the Amish are a religious group known for their avoidance of certain modern technologies. Transhumanists draw a parallel by arguing that in the near future there will probably be "humanish", people who choose to "stay human" by not adopting human enhancement technologies. They believe their choice must be respected and protected.

In his 2003 book Enough: Staying Human in an Engineered Age, environmental ethicist Bill McKibben argued at length against many of the technologies that transhumanists posit or support, including germinal choice technology, nanomedicine, and life extension strategies. He claims it would be morally wrong for humans to tamper with fundamental aspects of themselves (or their children) in an attempt to overcome universal human limitations, such as vulnerability to aging, maximum life span, and biological constraints on physical and cognitive ability. Attempts to "improve" themselves through such manipulation would remove limitations that provide a necessary context for the experience of meaningful human choice. He claims that human lives would no longer seem meaningful in a world where such limitations could be overcome technologically. Even the goal of using germinal choice technology for clearly therapeutic purposes should be relinquished, since it would inevitably produce temptations to tamper with such things as cognitive capacities. He argues that it is possible for societies to benefit from renouncing particular technologies, using as examples Ming Dynasty China, the Tokugawa shogunate in Japan, and the Amish.

Biopolitical activist Jeremy Rifkin and biologist Stuart Newman accept that biotechnology has the power to make profound changes in organismal identity. They argue against the genetic engineering of human beings because they fear the blurring of the boundary between human and artifact. Philosopher Keekok Lee sees such developments as part of an accelerating trend in modernization in which technology has been used to transform the "natural" into the "artefactual". In the extreme, this could lead to the manufacturing and enslavement of "monsters" such as human clones, human-animal chimeras, or bioroids, but even lesser dislocations of humans and non-humans from social and ecological systems are seen as problematic. The film Blade Runner (1982) and the novels The Boys From Brazil (1976) and The Island of Doctor Moreau (1896) depict elements of such scenarios, but Mary Shelley's 1818 novel Frankenstein; or, The Modern Prometheus is most often alluded to by critics who suggest that biotechnologies could create objectified and socially unmoored people as well as subhumans. Such critics propose that strict measures be implemented to prevent what they portray as dehumanizing possibilities from ever happening, usually in the form of an international ban on human genetic engineering.

Science journalist Ronald Bailey claims that McKibben's historical examples are flawed and support different conclusions when studied more closely. For example, few groups are more cautious than the Amish about embracing new technologies, but, though they shun television and use horses and buggies, some are welcoming the possibilities of gene therapy since inbreeding has afflicted them with a number of rare genetic diseases. Bailey and other supporters of technological alteration of human biology also reject the claim that life would be experienced as meaningless if some human limitations are overcome with enhancement technologies as extremely subjective.

Writing in Reason magazine, Bailey has accused opponents of research involving the modification of animals as indulging in alarmism when they speculate about the creation of subhuman creatures with human-like intelligence and brains resembling those of Homo sapiens. Bailey insists that the aim of conducting research on animals is simply to produce human health care benefits.

A different response comes from transhumanist personhood theorists who object to what they characterize as the anthropomorphobia fueling some criticisms of this research, which science fiction writer Isaac Asimov termed the "Frankenstein complex". For example, Woody Evans argues that, provided they are self-aware, human clones, human-animal chimeras and uplifted animals would all be unique persons deserving of respect, dignity, rights, responsibilities, and citizenship. They conclude that the coming ethical issue is not the creation of so-called monsters, but what they characterize as the "yuck factor" and "human-racism", that would judge and treat these creations as monstrous. In book 3 of his Corrupting the Image series, Douglas Hamp goes so far as to suggest that the Beast of John's Apocalypse is himself a hybrid who will induce humanity to take "the mark of the Beast", in the hopes of obtaining perfection and immortality.

At least one public interest organization, the U.S.-based Center for Genetics and Society, was formed, in 2001, with the specific goal of opposing transhumanist agendas that involve transgenerational modification of human biology, such as full-term human cloning and germinal choice technology. The Institute on Biotechnology and the Human Future of the Chicago-Kent College of Law critically scrutinizes proposed applications of genetic and nanotechnologies to human biology in an academic setting.

=== Socioeconomic effects ===
Some critics of libertarian transhumanism have focused on the likely socioeconomic consequences in societies in which divisions between rich and poor are on the rise. Bill McKibben, for example, suggests that emerging human enhancement technologies would be disproportionately available to those with greater financial resources, thereby exacerbating the gap between rich and poor and creating a "genetic divide". Even Lee M. Silver, the biologist and science writer who coined the term "reprogenetics" and supports its applications, has expressed concern that these methods could create a two-tiered society of genetically engineered "haves" and "have nots" if social democratic reforms lag behind implementation of enhancement technologies. The 1997 film Gattaca depicts a dystopian society in which one's social class depends entirely on genetic potential and is often cited by critics in support of these views.

These criticisms are also voiced by non-libertarian transhumanist advocates, especially self-described democratic transhumanists, who believe that the majority of current or future social and environmental issues (such as unemployment and resource depletion) must be addressed by a combination of political and technological solutions (like a guaranteed minimum income and alternative technology). Therefore, on the specific issue of an emerging genetic divide due to unequal access to human enhancement technologies, bioethicist James Hughes, in his 2004 book Citizen Cyborg: Why Democratic Societies Must Respond to the Redesigned Human of the Future, argues that progressives or, more precisely, techno-progressives, must articulate and implement public policies (i.e., a universal health care voucher system that covers human enhancement technologies) to attenuate this problem as much as possible, rather than trying to ban human enhancement technologies. The latter, he argues, might actually worsen the problem by making these technologies unsafe or available only to the wealthy on the local black market or in countries where such a ban is not enforced.

Sometimes, as in the writings of Leon Kass, the fear is that various institutions and practices judged as fundamental to civilized society would be damaged or destroyed. In his 2002 book Our Posthuman Future and in a 2004 Foreign Policy magazine article, political economist and philosopher Francis Fukuyama designates transhumanism as the world's most dangerous idea because he believes it may undermine the egalitarian ideals of democracy (in general) and liberal democracy (in particular) through a fundamental alteration of "human nature". Social philosopher Jürgen Habermas makes a similar argument in his 2003 book The Future of Human Nature, in which he asserts that moral autonomy depends on not being subject to another's unilaterally imposed specifications. Habermas thus suggests that the human "species ethic" would be undermined by embryo-stage genetic alteration. Critics such as Kass and Fukuyama hold that attempts to significantly alter human biology are not only inherently immoral, but also threaten the social order. Alternatively, they argue that implementation of such technologies would likely lead to the "naturalizing" of social hierarchies or place new means of control in the hands of totalitarian regimes. AI pioneer Joseph Weizenbaum criticizes what he sees as misanthropic tendencies in the language and ideas of some of his colleagues, in particular Minsky and Moravec, which, by devaluing the human organism per se, promotes a discourse that enables divisive and undemocratic social policies.

In a 2004 article in the libertarian monthly Reason, Ronald Bailey contested Fukuyama's assertions by arguing that political equality has never rested on the facts of human biology. He asserts that liberalism was founded not on the proposition of effective equality of human beings, or de facto equality, but on the assertion of an equality in political rights and before the law, or de jure equality. Bailey asserts that the products of genetic engineering may well ameliorate rather than exacerbate human inequality, giving to the many what were once the privileges of the few. Moreover, he argues, "the crowning achievement of the Enlightenment is the principle of tolerance". In fact, he says, political liberalism is already the solution to the issue of human and posthuman rights since in liberal societies the law is meant to apply equally to all, no matter how rich or poor, powerful or powerless, educated or ignorant, enhanced or unenhanced. Other thinkers sympathetic to transhumanist ideas, such as Russell Blackford, have also objected to the appeal to tradition and what they see as alarmism involved in Brave New World-type arguments.

==== Legislative responses ====
With greater awareness of artificial intelligence and other technologies, debates about transhumanism have entered legislatures.

In a 2019 House of Commons debate, Jon Cruddas predicted that politicians "will have to defend a discernible human condition" against transhumanist theory. He also made remarks critical of Nick Bostrom's work at institutions producing policy recommendations for the government of the United Kingdom.

In May 2025, before the United States House Committee on Oversight and Government Reform, US Representative Anna Paulina Luna mused about "transhumanist enhancements that exacerbate social inequalities or basically financial inequalities, creating an elite class of enhanced individuals." At the same hearing, Representative Marjorie Taylor Greene said, "I will state it very clearly: I am pro-humanity. I am not pro-transhumanity."

At the National Conservatism Conference in September 2025, US Senator Josh Hawley said: "The American republic is premised on his worth and his liberty. But the transhumanist ideal rejects the common man's worth. And artificial intelligence threatens the common man's liberty. To state it in the clearest terms, then: Americanism and the transhumanist revolution cannot coexist. And it is our job to see that Americanism wins."

==== Cultural aesthetics ====
In addition to the socioeconomic risks and implications of transhumanism, there are indeed implications and possible consequences in regard to cultural aesthetics. Currently, there are a number of ways in which people choose to represent themselves in society. The way in which a person dresses, hair styles, and body alteration all serve to identify the way a person presents themselves and is perceived by society. According to Foucault, society already governs and controls bodies by making them feel watched. This "surveillance" of society dictates how the majority of individuals choose to express themselves aesthetically.

One of the risks outlined in a 2004 article by Jerold Abrams is the elimination of differences in favor of universality. This, he argues, will eliminate the ability of individuals to subvert the possibly oppressive, dominant structure of society by way of uniquely expressing themselves externally. Such control over a population would have dangerous implications of tyranny. Yet another consequence of enhancing the human form not only cognitively, but physically, will be the reinforcement of "desirable" traits which are perpetuated by the dominant social structure.

=== New eugenics ===
The tradition of human enhancement originated with the eugenics movement that was once prominent in the biological sciences, and was later politicized in various ways. This continuity is especially clear in the case of Julian Huxley himself.

The major transhumanist organizations strongly condemn the coercion involved in such policies and reject the racist and classist assumptions on which they were based, along with the pseudoscientific notions that eugenic improvements could be accomplished in a practically meaningful time frame through selective human breeding. Instead, most transhumanist thinkers advocate a "new eugenics", a form of egalitarian liberal eugenics. In their 2000 book From Chance to Choice: Genetics and Justice, non-transhumanist bioethicists Allen Buchanan, Dan Brock, Norman Daniels and Daniel Wikler have argued that liberal societies have an obligation to encourage as wide an adoption of eugenic enhancement technologies as possible (so long as such policies do not infringe on individuals' reproductive rights or exert undue pressures on prospective parents to use these technologies) to maximize public health and minimize the inequalities that may result from both natural genetic endowments and unequal access to genetic enhancements. Most transhumanists holding similar views nonetheless distance themselves from the term "eugenics" (preferring "germinal choice" or "reprogenetics") to avoid having their position confused with the discredited theories and practices of early-20th-century eugenic movements.

Health law professor George Annas and technology law professor Lori Andrews are prominent advocates of the position that the use of these technologies could lead to human–posthuman caste warfare.

=== Existential risks ===
In his 2003 book Our Final Hour, British Astronomer Royal Martin Rees argues that advanced science and technology bring as much risk of disaster as opportunity for progress. However, Rees does not advocate a halt to scientific activity. Instead, he calls for tighter security and perhaps an end to traditional scientific openness. Advocates of the precautionary principle, such as many in the environmental movement, also favor slow, careful progress or a halt in potentially dangerous areas. Some precautionists believe that artificial intelligence and robotics present possibilities of alternative forms of cognition that may threaten human life.

Transhumanists do not necessarily rule out specific restrictions on emerging technologies so as to lessen the prospect of existential risk. Generally, however, they counter that proposals based on the precautionary principle are often unrealistic and sometimes even counter-productive as opposed to the technogaian current of transhumanism, which they claim is both realistic and productive. In his television series Connections, science historian James Burke dissects several views on technological change, including precautionism and the restriction of open inquiry. Burke questions the practicality of some of these views, but concludes that maintaining the status quo of inquiry and development poses hazards of its own, such as a disorienting rate of change and the depletion of our planet's resources. The common transhumanist position is a pragmatic one where society takes deliberate action to ensure the early arrival of the benefits of safe, clean, alternative technology, rather than fostering what it considers to be anti-scientific views and technophobia.

Nick Bostrom argues that even barring the occurrence of a singular global catastrophic event, basic Malthusian and evolutionary forces facilitated by technological progress threaten to eliminate the positive aspects of human society.

One transhumanist solution proposed by Bostrom to counter existential risks is control of differential technological development, a series of attempts to influence the sequence in which technologies are developed. In this approach, planners would strive to retard the development of possibly harmful technologies and their applications, while accelerating the development of likely beneficial technologies, especially those that offer protection against the harmful effects of others.

In their 2021 book Calamity Theory, Joshua Schuster and Derek Woods critique existential risks by arguing against Bostrom's transhumanist perspective, which emphasizes controlling and mitigating these risks through technological advancements. They contend that this approach relies too much on fringe science and speculative technologies and fails to address deeper philosophical and ethical problems about the nature of human existence and its limitations. Instead, they advocate an approach more grounded in secular existentialist philosophy, focusing on mental fortitude, community resilience, international peacebuilding, and environmental stewardship to better cope with existential risks.

==== Antinatalism and pronatalism ====
Although most people focus on the scientific and technological barriers on the road to human enhancement, Robbert Zandbergen argues that contemporary transhumanists' failure to critically engage the cultural current of antinatalism is a far bigger obstacle to a posthuman future. Antinatalism is a stance seeking to discourage, restrict, or terminate human reproduction to solve existential problems. If transhumanists fail to take this threat to human continuity seriously, they run the risk of seeing the collapse of the entire edifice of radical enhancement.

Simone and Malcolm Collins, founders of Pronatalist.org, are activists known primarily for their views and advocacy related to a secular and voluntaristic form of pronatalism, a stance encouraging higher birth rates to reverse demographic decline and its negative implications for the viability of modern societies and the possibility of a better future. Critical of transhumanism, they have expressed concern that life extension would worsen the problem of gerontocracy, causing toxic imbalances in power. The Collinses lament that voluntarily childfree transhumanists who "want to live forever believe they are the epitome of centuries of human cultural and biological evolution. They don’t think they can make kids that are better than them."

== Groups and organizations ==
- The Transhumanist Council, largest online transhumanist community
- Institute for Ethics and Emerging Technologies, nonprofit transhumanist think tank and advocacy organization
- Transhumanist Party, big-tent transhumanist political party based in the United States
- Lifeboat Foundation, group with advocates for technological enhancement and risk mitigation

== See also ==
- Assisted reproductive technology
- Brain-computer interface
- Body hacking
- Cyberware
- Cyborg
- Digital immortality
- Directed evolution (transhumanism)
- Do-it-yourself biology
- Future of Humanity Institute
- The Future of Work and Death
- Hard science fiction
- Institute for Ethics and Emerging Technologies
- Kardashev scale
- "My body, my choice"
- Meliorism
- Metaman (book)
- Participant evolution
- Posthuman
- Posthumanism
- Quantified self
- TechnoCalyps
- Technological dystopia
- Technological utopianism
- Transhuman
- Transhuman Space
- Transhumanism in fiction
- Life extension
