= Future Fantastic =

British documentary television series

- Genre: Science fiction documentary
- Directed by: Penny Southgate
- Presented by: Gillian Anderson
- Theme music composer: HAL / real VIVID
- Country of origin: United Kingdom
- Original language: English
- No. of seasons: 1
- No. of episodes: 9

Production
- Executive producer: Edward Briffa
- Producers: David McNab, Jasper James
- Editors: Allan Fowlie, David Sleight
- Running time: 24 minutes

Original release
- Network: BBC1
- Release: 21 June – 30 August 1996

Future Fantastic was a British documentary television series which premiered in 1996. This show looked at the how science and science fiction complement each other, and how ideas and technologies from the past are helping to shape our future. The series was narrated by Gillian Anderson and co-produced by the British Broadcasting Corporation, The Learning Channel and Pro Sieben.

== Episodes ==
=== "Alien" ===
Alien: Discusses the possibility of encountering intelligent life on other planets.

Interviewed Story Musgrave (astronaught), Seth Shostak (astronomer), Frank Drake (astronomer), Jill Tarter (astronomer), Arthur C. Clarke (author), Richard F. Haines (scientist), Robert Sheaffer (UFO investigator), Jack Cohen (biologist), John Clute (author), David Bischoff (author), Glenn Campbell (Area 51 Investigator), Bob Lazar (engineer)

This episode was first broadcast on 21 June 1996.

=== "I, Robot" ===
I, Robot: Discusses the evolving and growing role of artificial intelligence, computers, and robots in our everyday life.

Interviewed Joe Engelberger (roboticist), Red Whittaker (roboticist), Marvin Minsky (cognitive scientist), Hans Moravec (computer scientist), Takeo Kanade (roboticist), Kevin Warwick (roboticist), Rodney Brooks (roboticist)

This episode was first broadcast on 28 June 1996.

=== "Starman" ===
Starman: Looks at how we might eventually reach the stars.

Interviewed Nick Argento (historian), Arthur C. Clarke (author), Frederik Pohl (author), Yoji Kondo (author), Alan Bond (rocket engineer), Gerald A. Smith (scientist), Jack Williamson (author), Robert L. Forward (author), Michio Kaku (physicist), Patrick Moore (astronomer), Ron Miller (artist)

This episode was first broadcast on 5 July 1996.

=== "Incredible Shrinking Planet" ===
Incredible Shrinking Planet: Looks at the future of transport, including teleportation and time travel.

Interviewed John Clute (author), Paul Moller (engineer), James R. Powers (Designer), Dennis Bushnell (NASA scientist), Brian Motts (inventor), Robert L. Forward (author), Leik Myrabo (engineer), John C. Mankins (NASA scientist), John Anderson (NASA scientist), Larry Niven (author), Marc Levoy (head of the 3D Fax Project), Anton Zeilinger (physicist)

This episode was first broadcast on 12 July 1996.

=== "Brave New Body" ===
Brave New Body: Looks into how body modification will shape our lives in the future.

Interviewed Joseph M. Rosen (plastic surgeon), Charles Vacanti (biologist), Mark Pauline (roboticist), Martin Caidin (writer), Donald Humphrey (surgeon), Max More (futurist), Natasha Vita-More (author), Dr Eugene Dejuan (eye surgeon), Bruce Sterling (author), Greg Bear (author), Walter Gehring (biologist), Dr. Richard Ellenbogen (plastic surgeon)

This episode was first broadcast on 19 July 1996.

=== "Weird Science" ===
Weird Science: Shows how we have come close to defying gravity, and achieving invisibility and perpetual energy.

Interviewed John Clute (author), Michael Burns (physicist and military systems designer), Richard A. Hull (inventor), Peter Graneau (inventor), Jim Greggs (inventor), Franklin Mead (Senior. Scientist at the Advanced Concepts Office), Frank Close (physicist), Edwin May (nuclear physicist), Richard Wiseman (psychologist)

This episode was first broadcast on 9 August 1996.

=== "Brainstorm" ===
Brainstorm: Looks at technology being put into and onto people's heads to create artificial experiences.

Interviewed John Clute (author), Jonathan Walden (virtual reality engineer), Neal Stephenson (science fiction author), Richard Johnston (Human Interface Technology Lab), Andrew Junker (founder of Brainfingers), Grant McMillan (Wright-Patterson Air Force Base), Christopher Gallen (neurologist), Pat Cadigan (science fiction author), Richard A. Normann (bioengineer), Theodore Berger (bioengineer)

This episode was first broadcast on 16 August 1996.

=== "Underneath a purple sky" ===
Underneath a purple sky: Looks at the future of space tourism.

Interviewed Ray Bradbury (author), John Clute (author), Wendell Mendell (Planetary Scientist), Patrick Collins (professor of economics at Azabu University in Japan), Story Musgrave (astronaut), Greg Bennett (writer), Marshall Savage (author), Christopher McKay (planetary scientist), Kim Stanley Robinson (author), Jane Poynter (author), Taber MacCallum (Chief Technology Officer)

This episode was first broadcast on 23 August 1996.

=== "Immortal" ===
Immortal: Questions whether we may ever achieve immortality.

Interviewed Marvin Minsky (cognitive scientist), Max More (futurist), Natasha Vita-More (author), Rima Greenhill, Malcolm Greenhill, Michael R. Rose (evolutionary biologist), Siegfried Hekimi (biologist), François Schächter (biologist), Robert Ettinger (academic), Steve Bridge (President of Alcor), Michael Taylor (cryobiologist), Ralph C. Merkle (nanotechnologist), Brian Stableford (author), John Clute (author), Frank Tipler (mathematical physicist), Gregory Benford (author)

This episode was first broadcast on 30 August 1996.

== Theme music ==
The theme music to Future Fantastic was by HAL who later collaborated with Gillian Anderson on the track "Extremis" which was released by Virgin Records in 1997.

== Broadcast ==
Future Fantastic was broadcast in the United States on the Learning Channel in 1997.
