= Feline Philosophy =

2020 non-fiction book by John Gray

Feline Philosophy: Cats and the Meaning of Life
- Front cover
- Author: John Gray
- Language: English
- Genre: Nonfiction
- Publisher: Farrar, Straus and Giroux
- Publication date: 2020
- Publication place: United States
- Media type: Print, e-book
- Pages: 128 pages
- ISBN: 0374154112

Feline Philosophy: Cats and the Meaning of Life is a 2020 nonfiction book by the English political philosopher John Gray. The book uses the concept of the detached and carefree temperament of the typical house cat as a springboard for discussing humans' approach to philosophy and the meaning of life. Gray employs a lighthearted tone for much of the book in an attempt to write accessibly about the typically opaque subject of philosophy. The book was released to generally positive reviews, with reviewers often praising Gray's writing style and its broad appeal, while occasionally criticizing the author's conjecture about the behaviors and psychology of cats.

== Background ==
Gray, a former professor at the University of Oxford and the London School of Economics had previously written the 2002 book Straw Dogs, to which Feline Philosophy can be considered a postscript. Straw Dogs challenged the belief that humanity had progressed to a point beyond nature and baser animals, and the author noted that some believed he skewered much of modern philosophical thought but offered little as an alternative. Another Gray text, The Silence of Animals, similarly posits that humanity has a false sense of progress that acts as a "hubris that denies our animal nature". Feline Philosophy also uses animals as a catalyst for discussion about humanity, but with a lighter tone than the heavy-handed nature of those previous titles.

== Synopsis ==
Feline Philosophy consists of six chapters across 128 pages. In the first chapter, Gray presents the book's goal which is to impart what humankind can learn from the feline approach to the world. While cats live in tune with the world and their surroundings, humanity suffers from a disconnect between the self and nature, prompting it to look to philosophy and religion for answers. In the book's second chapter, "Why Cats Do Not Struggle to Be Happy", Gray goes on to argue that philosophy's reason for existence stems from the human tendency to experience anxiety. Whereas cats only feel anxious when in threatened or in an unknown place, humans live with the awareness that the entire world they inhabit is a threatening and unknown place. Deliberate attempts to pursue happiness often exacerbate the issue.

"Feline Ethics", the book's third chapter, sees Gray using the teachings of Taoism and the 17th-century philosopher Spinoza to argue that morality, both on a cultural as well as an individual level, is relative. Our goal as people should not be to pursue a nonexistent moral ideal, but rather attempt to achieve one's ideal self. The fourth chapter, "Human vs. Feline Love", uses examples of cats from literature to illustrate the difference between cats' and humans' capabilities for loving one another. While cats possess the ability to love purely, humans "are ruled by self-deception" more in our relationships than in any other aspect of our lives. "Time, Death, and the Feline Soul", the book's next chapter, uses cats from the historical record as a way of illustrating cats' appreciation of life as it is as opposed to humanity's agonizing over aging and death.

In the book's sixth and final chapter, Gray describes the ultimate meaninglessness of the search for life's meaning. People would be better served, he says, by following "the way within us" to find enrichment in our lives. Gray concludes with "Ten Feline Hints on How to Live Well", in which he summarizes the book's central thesis: "Forget about pursuing happiness, and you may find it."

== Reception ==
Feline Philosophy released on November 17, 2020, to generally positive reviews. Kelly Jane Torrance of Modern Age called it a "beautiful book", while Kirkus Reviews termed it "curious and exploratory". Paul J. D'Ambrosio of the Los Angeles Review of Books praised Gray's ability to endure a career of working in academia yet still be able to write engagingly and entertainingly for a broad audience.

Writing for The New York Times, Jennifer Szalai criticized the particular type of anthropomorphism Gray imparts upon his feline subjects, in which he not only applies human traits to them, but applies those that fit his narrative. Similarly, Charles Arrowsmith writes for The Washington Post that "it's hard to resist the usual pleasures of reading Gray", but that the author may be falling prey to "sentimental projection" and doesn't provide evidence for his assertions about feline psychology.
