= EHT =

EHT may refer to:

- Earlington Heights station, of the Miami-Dade County Metrorail in Florida
- Eastern Harbour Tunnel, a transport tunnel in Hong Kong
- Eicosanoyl-5-hydroxytryptamide, a dietary supplement
- Egg Harbor Township, New Jersey, United States
- Euro Hockey Tour, ice hockey tournament
- Event Horizon Telescope, array of radio telescopes
- Extra high tension, in electrical supply
- Seattle head tax, a proposed tax in Seattle, United States
