= FM-2030 =

Transhumanist and futurist (1930–2000)

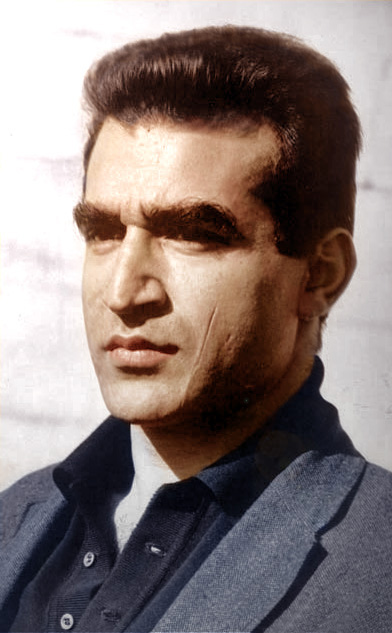
- Born: Fereidoun M. Esfandiary; October 15, 1930; Brussels, Belgium
- Died: July 8, 2000 (aged 69); New York City, U.S.
- Resting place: Cryopreserved at Alcor Life Extension Foundation
- Education: University of California, Los Angeles
- Occupations: Writer, philosopher, teacher, consultant
- Writing career
- Genres: Science fiction, futurology
- Notable work: Are You a Transhuman?
- Movement: Transhumanism

FM-2030 (born Fereidoun M. Esfandiary; Persian: فریدون اسفندیاری; October 15, 1930 – July 8, 2000) was a Belgian-born Iranian-American author, teacher, transhumanist philosopher, futurist, consultant, and Olympic athlete.

He became notable as a transhumanist with the book Are You a Transhuman?: Monitoring and Stimulating Your Personal Rate of Growth in a Rapidly Changing World, published in 1989. He wrote a number of works of fiction under his original name F. M. Esfandiary.

== Early life and education ==
FM-2030 was born Fereydoon M. Esfandiary on October 15, 1930, in Belgium to the Iranian diplomat Abdol-Hossein "A. H." Sadigh Esfandiary (1894–1986), who served from 1920 to 1960. He travelled widely as a child, living in 17 countries including Iran, India, and Afghanistan, by age 11. He represented Iran as a basketball player and wrestler at the 1948 Olympic Games in London. He attended primary school in Iran and England and completed his secondary education at Colleges Des Freres, a Jesuit school in Jerusalem. By the time he was 18, aside from his native Persian, he spoke Arabic, Hebrew, French, and English. He started his college education at the University of California, Berkeley, and later transferred to the University of California, Los Angeles, where he graduated in 1952. He served on the United Nations Conciliation Commission for Palestine from 1952 to 1954.

== Name change and opinions ==
In 1970, after publishing his book Optimism One, he started using the name FM-2030 for two main reasons: to reflect the hope and belief that he would live to celebrate his 100th birthday in 2030; and more importantly, to break free of naming conventions rooted in a collectivist mentality, and existing only as a relic of humankind's tribalistic past. He formalized his name change in 1988. He viewed traditional names as almost always stamping a label of collective identity – varying from gender to nationality – on the individual, thereby existing as prima facie elements of thought processes in the human cultural fabric, that tended to degenerate into stereotyping, factionalism, and discrimination. In his own words, "Conventional names define a person's past: ancestry, ethnicity, nationality, religion. I am not who I was ten years ago and certainly not who I will be in twenty years. [...] The name 2030 reflects my conviction that the years around 2030 will be a magical time. In 2030 we will be ageless, and everyone will have an excellent chance to live forever. 2030 is a dream and a goal." As a staunch anti-nationalist, he believed "There are no illegal immigrants, only irrelevant borders."

In 1973, he published a political manifesto Up-Wingers: A Futurist Manifesto in which he portrays both the ideological left and right as outdated, and in their place proposes a schema of Up-Wingers (those who look to the sky and the future) and Down-Wingers (those who look to the earth and the past). FM-2030 identified with the former. He argued that the nuclear family structure and the idea of a city would disappear, being replaced by modular social communities he called mobilia, powered by communitarianism, which would persist and then disappear.

FM-2030 believed that synthetic body parts would one day make life expectancy irrelevant; shortly before his death from pancreatic cancer, he described the pancreas as "a stupid, dumb, wretched organ".

In terms of civilization, he wrote: "No civilization of the past was great. They were all primitive and persecutory, founded on mass subjugation and mass murder." In terms of identity, he stated "The young modern is not losing his identity. He is gladly disencumbering himself of it." He believed that eventually, nations would disappear, and that identities would shift from cultural to personal. In a 1972 Op-Ed in The New York Times, he wrote that the leadership in the Arab–Israeli conflict had failed, and that the warring sides were "acting like adolescents, refuse to resolve their wasteful 25-year-old brawl", and that the world was "irreversibly evolving beyond the concept of national homeland".

== Personal life ==
FM-2030 was a lifelong vegetarian and said he would not eat anything that had a mother. He famously refused to answer any questions about his nationality, age and upbringing, claiming that such questions were irrelevant and that he was a "global person". FM-2030 once said, "I am a 21st century person who was accidentally launched in the 20th. I have a deep nostalgia for the future." As he spent much of his childhood in India, he spoke English with a slight Indian accent. He taught at The New School, University of California, Los Angeles, and Florida International University. He worked as a corporate consultant for Lockheed and J. C. Penney. He was an atheist. FM-2030 was, in his own words, a follower of "up-wing" politics (i.e. neither right-wing nor left-wing but something else), by which he meant that he endorsed universal progress. He was in a non-exclusive "friendship" (his preferred term for relationship) with Flora Schnall, a lawyer and fellow Harvard Law Class of 1959 graduate, from the 1960s until his death. FM-2030 and Schnall attended the same class as Ruth Bader Ginsburg. He resided in Westwood, Los Angeles, as well as Miami.

== Death ==
FM-2030 died on July 8, 2000, from pancreatic cancer at a friend's apartment in Manhattan. He was placed in cryonic suspension at the Alcor Life Extension Foundation in Scottsdale, Arizona, where his body remains today. He did not have remote standby arrangements, so no Alcor team member was present at his death, but FM-2030 was the first person to be vitrified, rather than simply frozen as previous cryonics patients had been. FM-2030 was survived by four sisters and one brother.

== Published works ==
Fiction

- The Day of Sacrifice (1959) available as an eBook
- The Beggar (1965)
- Identity Card (1966) (ISBN 0-460-03843-5) available as an eBook

Non-fiction

- Optimism one; the emerging radicalism (1970) (ISBN 0-393-08611-9)
- Up-Wingers: A Futurist Manifesto (1973) (ISBN 0-381-98243-2) (pbk.) Available as an eBook ISBN FW00007527, Publisher: e-reads, Pub. Date: Jan 1973, File Size: 153K
- Telespheres (1977) (ISBN 0-445-04115-3)
- Are You a Transhuman?: Monitoring and Stimulating Your Personal Rate of Growth in a Rapidly Changing World (1989) (ISBN 0-446-38806-8).

== Cultural references ==
- In Dan Brown's novel Inferno, transhumanist characters who admire FM-2030 pay tribute to him by adopting his naming convention and taking names such as FS2080.
- Several musical artists, such as the Reptaliens, Dataport, Ghosthack, Vorja, Gavin Osborn and Philip Sumner have created songs and albums named after FM-2030.
- A film titled 2030 released in 2020, which explored the possibility of FM-2030's future revival.
- A short story by Korean writer Jeong Jidon titled "내 여자친구의 남자친구" ("My Girlfriend's Boyfriend") in the 2023 anthology "사랑, 이별, 죽음에 관한 짧은 소설" ("Short Stories about Love, Farewell & Death") has a cryopreserved mathematician named FM-2080, who describes himself as the 5th FM starting with FM-2030 and the first one to resurrect.

== See also ==
- Blue skies research
- Steve Fuller
- Breakthrough Institute
- Proactionary Principle
- Transhumanist politics
- Bright green environmentalism
- Lifeboat Foundation
- Space colonization
- Colonization of Mars
