= The World's Most Dangerous Ideas =

2004 report published in Foreign Policy

The World's Most Dangerous Ideas is a September/October 2004 special report published in the bimonthly American magazine Foreign Policy.

== Criteria ==
Eight notable authors were asked to issue an early warning on the ideas or ideologies that will be most destructive in the coming years.

== Nominees ==
- War on evil (Robert Wright)
- Business as usual at the U.N. (Samantha Power)
- Transhumanism (Francis Fukuyama)
- Free money (Alice Rivlin)
- Undermining free will (Paul Davies)
- Spreading democracy (Eric Hobsbawm)
- Religious intolerance (Martha Nussbaum)
- Hating America (Fareed Zakaria)

=== Criticism ===
Some of the nominated ideas have elicited accusations of alarmism by others.
