= John Gray (philosopher) =

English political philosopher (born 1948)

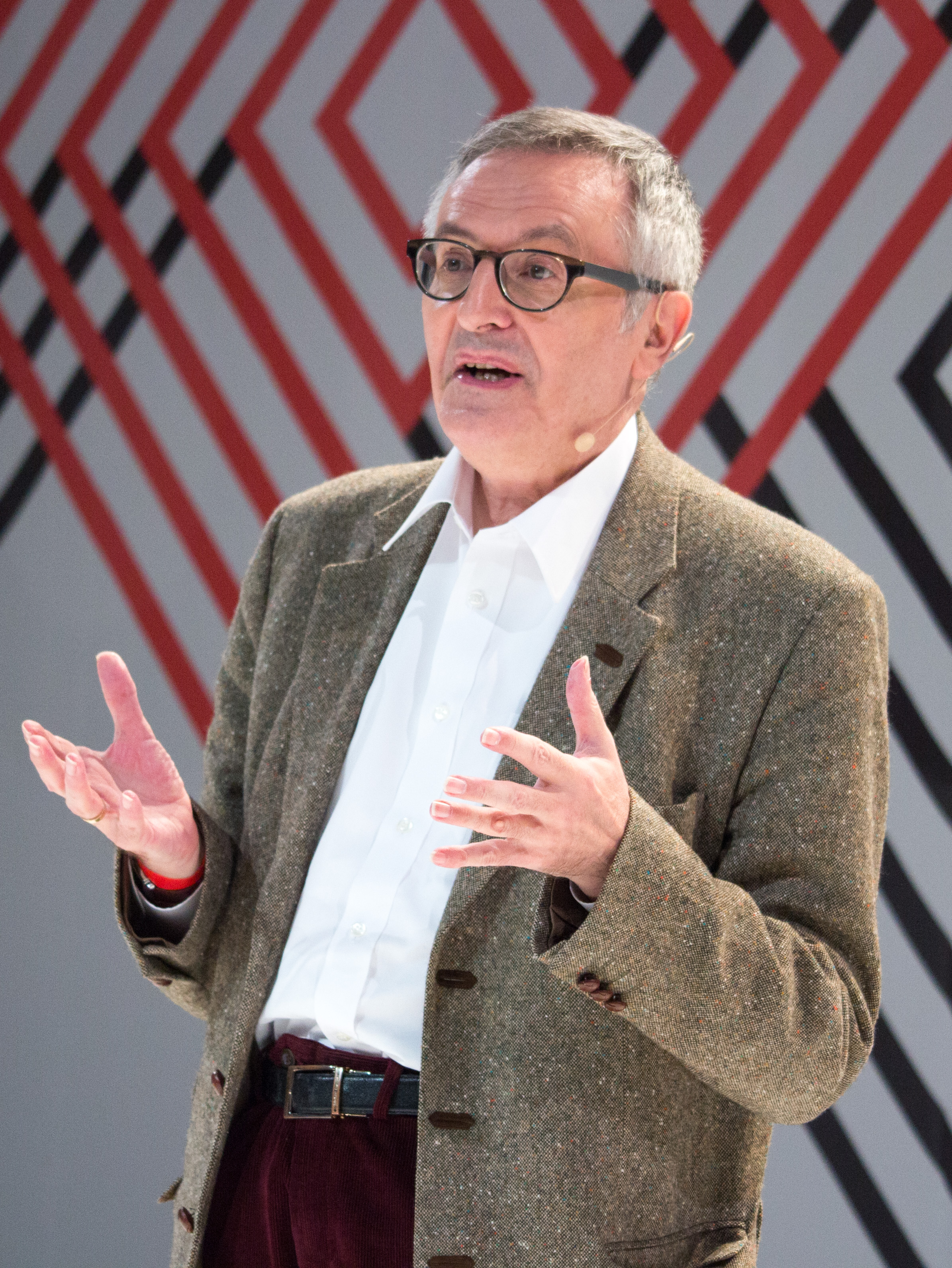
- Gray in 2015
- Born: John Nicholas Gray; 17 April 1948 (age 78); South Shields, County Durham, England

Education
- Education: Exeter College, Oxford (BA, MPhil, DPhil)

Philosophical work
- Era: Contemporary philosophy
- Region: Western philosophy
- School: Analytic
- Main interests: Political philosophy, history of ideas, philosophical pessimism
- Notable ideas: Agonistic liberalism, criticism of humanism

John Nicholas Gray (born 17 April 1948) is an English political philosopher and author with interests in analytic philosophy, the history of ideas and philosophical pessimism. He retired in 2008 as School Professor of European Thought at the London School of Economics and Political Science. Gray contributes regularly to The Guardian, UnHerd, The Times Literary Supplement and the New Statesman, where he is the lead book reviewer. He is an atheist.

Gray has written several influential books, including False Dawn: The Delusions of Global Capitalism (1998), which argues that free market globalisation is an unstable Enlightenment project currently in the process of disintegration; Straw Dogs: Thoughts on Humans and Other Animals (2002), which attacks philosophical humanism, a worldview which Gray sees as originating in religions; and Black Mass: Apocalyptic Religion and the Death of Utopia (2007), a critique of utopian thinking in the modern world.

Gray sees volition, and hence morality, as an illusion, and portrays humanity as a ravenous species engaged in wiping out other forms of life. Gray has written that "humans ... cannot destroy the Earth, but they can easily wreck the environment that sustains them."

== Academic career ==
Gray was born into a working-class family, with a docker-turned-carpenter father, in South Shields, County Durham. He attended South Shields Grammar-Technical School for Boys from 1959 until 1967, then studied at Exeter College, Oxford, reading philosophy, politics and economics (PPE), completing his B.A., Masters of Philosophy and Doctorate in Philosophy.

He formerly held posts as lecturer in political theory at the University of Essex, fellow and tutor in politics at Jesus College, Oxford, and lecturer and then professor of politics at the University of Oxford. He has served as a visiting professor at Harvard University (1985–86) and Stranahan Fellow at the Social Philosophy and Policy Center, Bowling Green State University (1990–1994), and has also held visiting professorships at Tulane University's Murphy Institute (1991) and Yale University (1994). He was Professor of European Thought at the London School of Economics and Political Science until his retirement from academic life in early 2008.

== Political and philosophical thought ==
Among philosophers, he is known for his exploration of the uneasy relationship between value pluralism and liberalism in the work of Isaiah Berlin.

Gray's political thought is noted for its mobility across the political spectrum over the years. As a student, Gray was on the left and continued to vote Labour into the mid-1970s. By 1976 he had shifted towards a right-liberal New Right position, on the basis that the world was changing irrevocably through technological inventions, realigned financial markets and new economic power blocs and that the left failed to comprehend the magnitude and nature of this change. In the 1990s Gray became an advocate for environmentalism and New Labour. Gray considers the conventional (left-wing/right-wing) political spectrum of conservatism and social democracy as no longer viable.

On liberalism, Gray identified the common strands in liberal thought as being individualist, egalitarian, meliorist, and universalist. The individualist element avers the ethical primacy of the human being against the pressures of social collectivism, the egalitarian element assigns the same moral worth and status to all individuals, the meliorist element asserts that successive generations can improve their sociopolitical arrangements, and the universalist element affirms the moral unity of the human species and marginalises local cultural differences.

More recently, he has criticised neoliberalism, the global free market and some of the central currents in Western thinking, such as humanism, while moving towards aspects of green thought, drawing on the Gaia theory of James Lovelock. It is perhaps for this critique of humanism that Gray is best known.

Central to the doctrine of humanism, in Gray's view, is the inherently utopian belief in meliorism; that is, that humans are not limited by their biological natures and that advances in ethics and politics are cumulative and that they can alter or improve the human condition, in the same way that advances in science and technology have altered or improved living standards.

Gray contends, in opposition to this view, that history is not progressive, but cyclical. Human nature, he argues, is an inherent obstacle to cumulative ethical or political progress. Seeming improvements, if there are any, can very easily be reversed: one example he has cited has been the use of torture by the United States against terrorist suspects. "What's interesting", Gray said in an interview in 032c magazine, "is that torture not only came back, but was embraced by liberals, and defended by liberals. Now there are a lot of people, both liberal and conservative, who say, 'Well, it's a very complicated issue.' But it wasn't complicated until recently. They didn't say that five or ten years ago."

Furthermore, he argues that this belief in progress, commonly imagined to be secular and liberal, is in fact derived from an erroneous Christian notion of humans as morally autonomous beings categorically different from other animals. This belief, and the corresponding idea that history makes sense, or is progressing towards something, is in Gray's view merely a Christian prejudice.

In Straw Dogs he argues that the idea that humans are self-determining agents does not pass the acid test of experience. Those Darwinist thinkers who believe humans can take charge of their own destiny to prevent environmental degradation are, in this view, not naturalists, but apostles of humanism.

He identifies the Enlightenment as the point at which the Christian doctrine of salvation was taken over by secular idealism and became a political religion with universal emancipation as its aim. Communism, fascism and "global democratic capitalism" are characterised by Gray as Enlightenment "projects" which have led to needless suffering, in Gray's view, as a result of their ideological allegiance to this religion.

=== Agonistic liberalism ===
The term agonistic liberalism appears in Gray's 1995 book Isaiah Berlin. Gray uses this phrase to describe what he believes is Berlin's theory of politics, namely his support for both value pluralism and liberalism.

More generally, agonistic liberalism could be used to describe any kind of liberalism that claims its own value commitments do not form a complete vision of politics and society, and that one instead needs to look for what Berlin calls an "uneasy equilibrium" between competing values. In Gray's view, many contemporary liberal theorists would fall into this category, for instance John Rawls and Karl Popper.

== Reception ==
=== Acclaim ===
Gray's work has been praised by, amongst others, the novelists J. G. Ballard, Will Self and John Banville, the theologian Don Cupitt, the journalist Bryan Appleyard, the political scientist David Runciman, the historian and cultural critic Morris Berman, the investor and philanthropist George Soros, the environmental scientist James Lovelock and the author Nassim Nicholas Taleb.

Friedrich Hayek described Gray's 1984 book Hayek on Liberty as "The first survey of my work which not only fully understands but is able to carry on my ideas beyond the point at which I left off."

His 1998 book False Dawn was praised by George Soros as "a powerful analysis of the deepening instability of global capitalism" which "should be read by all who are concerned about the future of the global economy". John Banville praised Black Mass, saying that "Gray's assault on Enlightenment ideas of progress is timelier than ever".

His 2002 book Straw Dogs: Thoughts on Humans and Other Animals has received particular praise. Ballard wrote that the book "challenges most of our assumptions about what it means to be human, and convincingly shows that most of them are delusions" and described it "a powerful and brilliant book", "an essential guide to the new millennium" and "the most exhilarating book I have read since Richard Dawkins's The Selfish Gene." Self called the book "a contemporary work of philosophy devoid of jargon, wholly accessible, and profoundly relevant to the rapidly evolving world we live in" and wrote "I read it once, I read it twice and took notes. I arranged to meet its author so I could publicise the book – I thought it that good."

In 2002 Straw Dogs was named a book of the year by Ballard in The Daily Telegraph; by George Walden in The Sunday Telegraph; by Self, Joan Bakewell, Jason Cowley and David Marquand in the New Statesman; by Andrew Marr in The Observer; by Jim Crace in The Times; by Hugh Lawson Tancred in The Spectator; by Richard Holloway in the Glasgow Herald; and by Sue Cook in The Sunday Express.

Nassim Nicholas Taleb has written that Gray is the modern thinker for whom he has the most respect, calling him "prophetic".

=== Criticism ===
Gray's Straw Dogs has been criticised by Terry Eagleton, who has written: "mixing nihilism and New Ageism in equal measure, Gray scoffs at the notion of progress for 150 pages before conceding that there is something to be said for anaesthetics. The enemy in his sights is not so much a straw dog as a straw man: the kind of starry-eyed rationalist who passed away with John Stuart Mill, but who he has to pretend still rules the world".

The academic and author Danny Postel of the University of Denver also took issue with Straw Dogs. Postel stated that Gray's claim that environmental destruction was the result of humanity's flawed nature would be "welcome news to the captains of industry and the architects of the global economy; the ecological devastation they leave in their wake, according to Gray, has nothing to do with their exploits." Postel also claimed that too much of Straw Dogs rested on "blanket assertion", and criticised Gray's use of the term "plague of people" as an outdated "neo-Malthusian persiflage about overpopulation". Postel strongly condemned Gray for outlining "complete political passivity. There is no point whatsoever in our attempting to make the world a less cruel or more livable place."

In his 2004 book, How Mumbo-Jumbo Conquered the World, the British journalist, writer and broadcaster Francis Wheen wrote:

"Conservatives, Marxists, post-modernists and pre-modernists have queued up to take a kick at the bruised ideas of the eighteenth century. The most vicious of these boot-boys is John Gray, professor of European thought at the London School of Economics, who has published dozens of increasingly apocalyptic books and articles on the need to end the Enlightenment project forthwith. Whereas MacIntyre seeks sanctuary in twelfth-century monasteries, for Gray our only hope of salvation is to embrace Eastern mysticism ... Taoism seems to be his favoured creed but it is hard to interpret Gray's prescriptions with any certainty, partly because of his scattergun style but mostly because he changes his mind so often. A line on the dust-jacket of Enlightenment's Wake (1995), which says that the book 'stakes out the elements of John Gray's new position' could just as well be appended to everything he writes."

== BBC Radio ==
Gray has made several broadcasts for BBC Radio 4's programme A Point of View.

In August and September 2011 he made six broadcasts:

- Greece and the Meaning of Folly: Taking the myth of the Trojan Horse as his starting point, he explores what he sees as the modern-day folly unfolding in Europe.
- Kim Philby: Why Kim Philby and so many others failed to predict the future.
- The Revolution of Capitalism: Why an increasing number of people believe that Karl Marx was right.
- Cats, Birds and Humans: Why the human animal needs contact with something other than itself.
- Believing in Belief: Argues that the scientific and rationalist attack on religion is misguided.
- Churchill, Chance and the Black Dog: The chance encounters that made Winston Churchill Britain's wartime prime minister.

He presented a second sequence from November 2014, sharing his views on:

- Capitalism and the Myth of Social Evolution
- Soylent and the Charm of the Fast Lane
- Dostoevsky and Dangerous Ideas
- Thinking the Unthinkable

In March 2023 he made another broadcast:

- Proportional Representation and a New Politics

Other programmes include:

- "The Dangers of a Higher Education" (23 February 2018)
- "Teffi: Silver Shoes and the Dream of Revolution" (2 March 2018)
- "Brexit and Illiberal Europe" (July 2018)

== Honours ==
Asteroid 91199 Johngray, discovered by the astronomer Eric Walter Elst at ESO's La Silla Observatory in 1998, was named in his honour. The official naming citation was published by the Minor Planet Center on 18 June 2008 (M.P.C. 63174). Gray is a member of World Minds.

== Books ==
- Gray, John (1984). Hayek on Liberty. Hoboken, New Jersey: Wiley-Blackwell. ISBN 978-0-85520-710-6 – via Internet Archive.
  - Gray, John (1998). Hayek on Liberty (Rev. ed.). London & New York: Routledge. ISBN 978-0-415-17315-5.
- Gray, John (1986). Liberalism. Minneapolis: University of Minnesota Press. ISBN 978-0-8166-1521-6.
  - Gray, John (1998). Liberalism (2nd ed.). Milton Keynes: Open University Press. ISBN 978-0-8166-2801-8.
- Gray, John (1989). Liberalisms: Essays in Political Philosophy. London & New York: Routledge. ISBN 978-0-415-00744-3.
- Gray, John (1991). J.S. Mill's On Liberty in Focus. London & New York: Routledge. ISBN 978-0-415-01001-6.
  - Gray, John (1996). Mill on Liberty: A Defence (2nd ed.). London & New York: Routledge. ISBN 978-0-415-12474-4.
- Gray, John (1993). Beyond the New Right: Markets, Government and the Common Environment. London & New York: Routledge. ISBN 978-0-415-09297-5.
- Gray, John (1993). Post-Liberalism: Studies in Political Thought. London & New York: Routledge. ISBN 978-0-415-08873-2.
- Gray, John (1995). Isaiah Berlin. London & New York: HarperCollins. ISBN 978-0-00-255582-1.
- Gray, John (1995). Enlightenment's Wake: Politics and Culture at the Close of the Modern Age. London & New York: Routledge. ISBN 978-0-415-12475-1.
- Gray, John (1996). After Social Democracy: Politics, Capitalism and the Common Life. London: Demos. ISBN 978-1-898309-52-9.
- Gray, John (1997). Endgames: Questions in Late Modern Political Thought. Cambridge: Polity Press. ISBN 978-0-415-17315-5.
- Gray, John (1998). False Dawn: The Delusions of Global Capitalism. London: Granta Books. ISBN 978-1-86207-023-3.
  - Gray, John (2009). False Dawn: The Delusions of Global Capitalism (Rev. ed.). London: Granta Books. ISBN 978-1-84708-132-2.
- Gray, John (1999). Voltaire. London & New York: Routledge. ISBN 978-0-415-92394-1.
- Gray, John (2000). Two Faces of Liberalism. Cambridge: Polity Press. ISBN 978-0-7456-2259-0.
- Gray, John (2002). Straw Dogs: Thoughts on Humans & Other Animals. London: Granta Books. ISBN 978-1-86207-512-2.
- Gray, John (2003). Al Qaeda and What It Means to Be Modern. New York: The New Press. ISBN 978-1-56584-805-4.
- Gray, John (2004). Heresies: Against Progress and Other Illusions. London: Granta Books. ISBN 978-1-86207-718-8.
- Gray, John (2007). Black Mass: Apocalyptic Religion and the Death of Utopia. London: Allen Lane. ISBN 978-0-7139-9915-0.
- Gray, John (2009). Gray's Anatomy: Selected Writings. London: Allen Lane. ISBN 978-1-84614-191-1.
  - Gray, John (2016). Gray's Anatomy: Selected Writings (Rev. ed.). London: Penguin Books. ISBN 978-0-14-198111-6.
- Gray, John (2011). The Immortalization Commission: Science and the Strange Quest to Cheat Death. New York: Farrar, Straus and Giroux. ISBN 978-0-374-17506-1.
- Gray, John (2013). The Silence of Animals: On Progress and Other Modern Myths. New York: Farrar, Straus and Giroux. ISBN 978-0-374-22917-7.
- Gray, John (2016). The Soul of the Marionette: A Short Inquiry into Human Freedom. London: Penguin Books. ISBN 978-0-241-95390-7.
- Gray, John (2018). Seven Types of Atheism. London: Allen Lane. ISBN 978-0-241-19941-1.
- Gray, John (2021). Feline Philosophy: Cats and the Meaning of Life. London: Penguin Books. ISBN 978-0-14-198842-9.
- Gray, John (2023). The New Leviathans: Thoughts After Liberalism. London: Allen Lane. ISBN 978-0-241-55495-1.

=== Film appearances ===
- Marx Reloaded, Arte, April 2011.
