= Daedalus; or, Science and the Future =

1924 book by British scientist J. B. S. Haldane

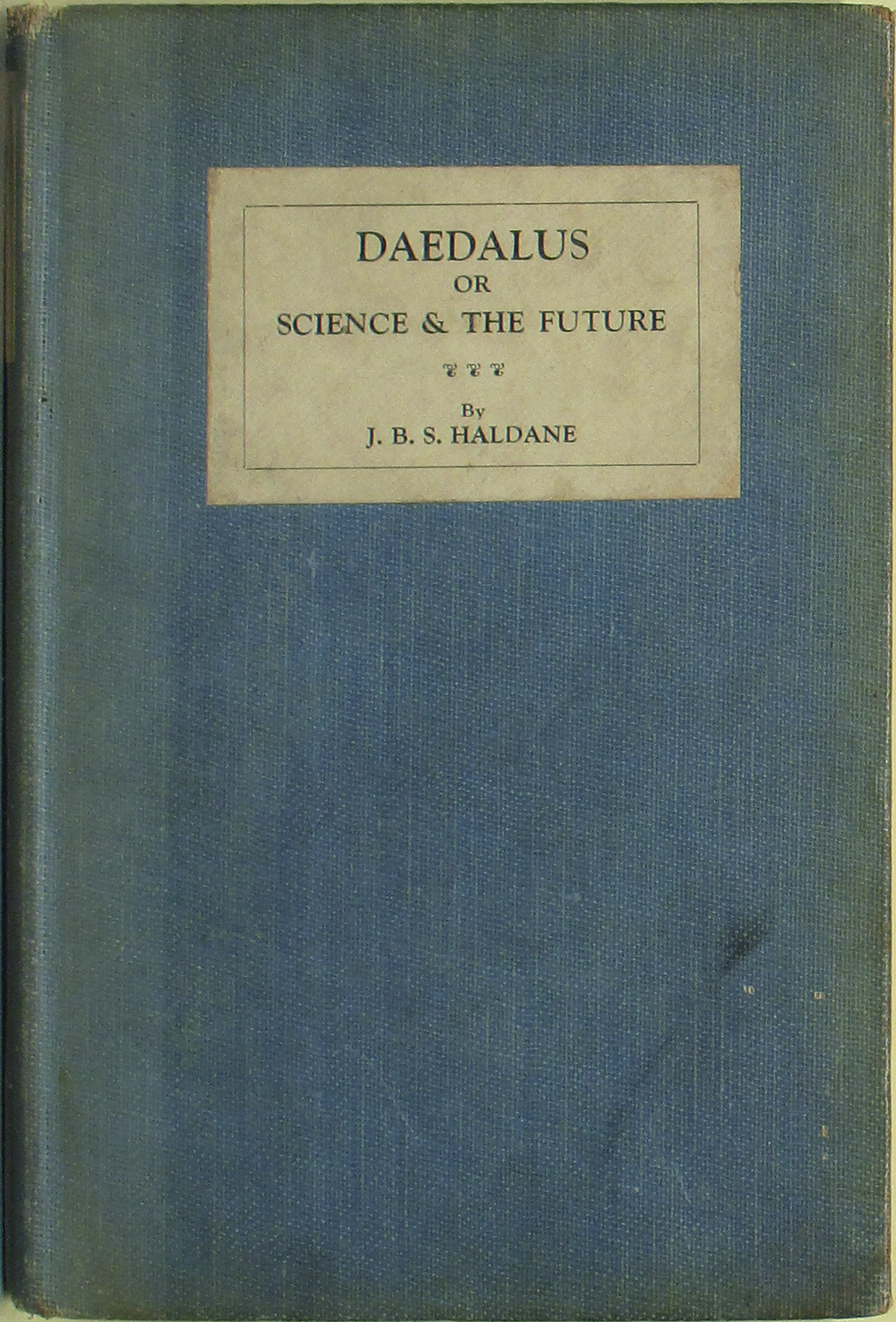
- Author: J. B. S. Haldane
- Publication date: 1924

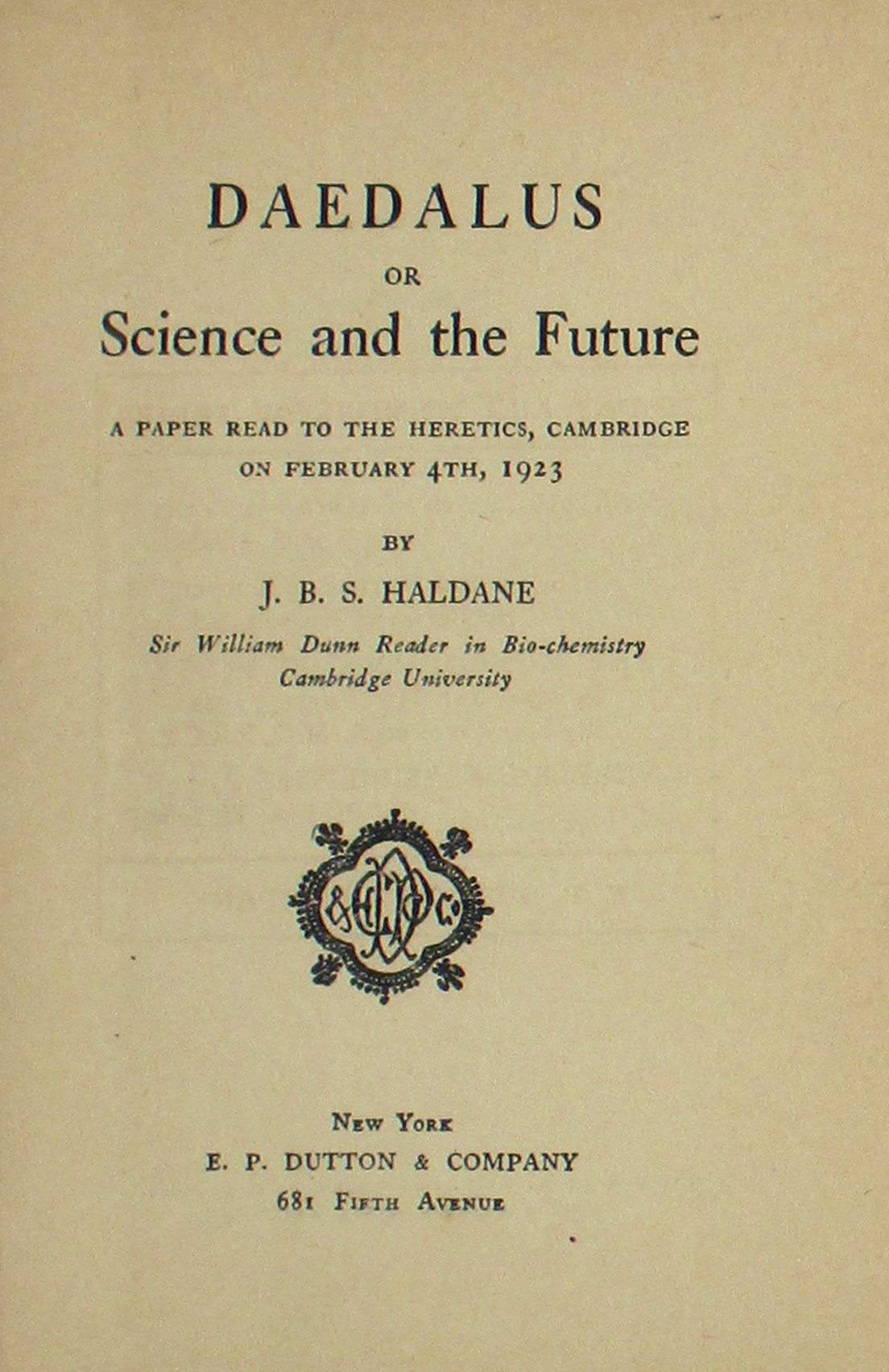
Title page

Daedalus; or, Science and the Future is a book by the British scientist J. B. S. Haldane, published in England in 1924. It was the text of a lecture read to the Heretics Society (an intellectual club at the University of Cambridge) on 4 February 1923.

Haldane uses the Greek myth of Daedalus as a symbol for the revolutionary nature of science with particular regard to his own discipline of biology.

The chemical or physical inventor is always a Prometheus. There is no great invention, from fire to flying, which has not been hailed as an insult to some god. But if every physical and chemical invention is a blasphemy, every biological invention is a perversion. There is hardly one which, on first being brought to the notice of an observer from any nation which had not previously heard of their existence, would not appear to him as indecent and unnatural.

He also expressed skepticism over the human benefits of some scientific advances, arguing that scientific advance would bring grief, rather than progress to mankind, unless it was accompanied by a similar advance in ethics.

The book is an early vision of transhumanism and his vision of a future in which humans controlled their own evolution through directed mutation and use of in vitro fertilisation ("ectogenesis") was a major influence on Aldous Huxley's Brave New World. The book ends with the image of a biologist, much like Haldane himself, in a laboratory: "just a poor little scrubby underpaid man groping blindly amid the mazes of the ultramicroscope... conscious of his ghastly mission and proud of it."

The book has been discussed at length by other writers, including Freeman Dyson in his book Imagined Worlds and Sal Restivo in Science, Society, and Values, and the concept has been used in contemporary science lectures.
