= False Dawn: The Delusions of Global Capitalism =

1998 book by John N. Gray

- Author: John Gray
- Language: English
- Genre: Politics
- Publisher: Granta Books
- Publication date: 1998
- ISBN: 1-86207-530-1

False Dawn: The Delusions of Global Capitalism is a 1998 book by English political philosopher John Gray, in which he argues that free-market globalization is unstable and is in the process of collapsing.

In chapter one Gray groups together thinkers such as John Locke and Karl Marx on the basis of striving for an Enlightenment Utopia in which "a diversity of cultures ... [is] a stage to a universal civilization." Specific efforts to impose a "universal civilization" included Victorian-era England, the Soviet Union and, currently, the United States as "the last great power to base its policies on this enlightenment thesis", such as with the Washington Consensus.

A 2002 edition includes a foreword that relates the themes of False Dawn to the 11 September 2001 attacks and the new US military posture that led to the 2003 invasion of Iraq. Gray notes how the economic shock therapy in post-communist nations has resulted in "the resources of the vast Soviet war machine ... [being] sold to the highest bidder ... [including] non-state forces that were waging unconventional war ... [such as] terrorist networks." Also, the resource-scarcity from global industrialization is contributing to resource wars and a revival of the Great Game.

== Reception ==
The first edition of False Dawn includes a positive review from the billionaire investor George Soros, stating, "A powerful analysis of the deepening instability of global capitalism. It should be read by all who are concerned about the future of the world economy."

== See also ==
- Classical liberalism
- Neoliberalism
- Multinational corporation
- World on Fire (book)
- Unequal Protection
