= Extropianism =

Stance favoring continuous technological evolution and longer lifespans

Extropianism, also referred to as the philosophy of extropy, is an "evolving framework of values and standards for continuously improving the human condition". Extropians believe that advances in science and technology will some day let people live indefinitely. An extropian may wish to contribute to this goal, e.g. by doing research and development or by volunteering to test new technology.

Originated by a set of principles developed by the philosopher Max More in The Principles of Extropy, extropian thinking places strong emphasis on rational thinking and on practical optimism. According to More, these principles "do not specify particular beliefs, technologies, or policies". Extropians share an optimistic view of the future, expecting considerable advances in computational power, life extension, nanotechnology, and the like. Many extropians foresee the eventual realization of indefinite lifespans or immortality, and the recovery, thanks to future advances in biomedical technology or mind uploading, of those whose bodies/brains have been preserved by means of cryonics.

== Extropy ==
The term extropy, as defined by Max More, is "The extent of a living or organizational system’s intelligence, functional order, vitality, and capacity and drive for improvement". It means the opposite of entropy, metaphorically interpreted as the tendency to degenerate and die out. Extropianism is "the philosophy that seeks to increase extropy".

== Extropy Institute ==
In 1986, More joined Alcor, a cryonics company, and helped establish (along with Michael Price, Garret Smyth and Luigi Warren) the first European cryonics organization, Mizar Limited (later Alcor UK). In 1987, More moved to Los Angeles from Oxford University in England to work on his Ph.D. in philosophy at the University of Southern California.

In 1988, Extropy: The Journal of Transhumanist Thought was first published. (For the first few issues, it was "Extropy: Vaccine for Future Shock".) This brought together thinkers with interests in artificial intelligence, nanotechnology, genetic engineering, life extension, mind uploading, idea futures, robotics, space exploration, memetics, and the politics and economics of transhumanism. Alternative media organizations soon began reviewing the magazine, and it attracted interest from like-minded thinkers. Later, More and Tom Bell co-founded the Extropy Institute (ExI), a non-profit 501(c)(3) educational organization. The institute was formed as a transhumanist networking and information center to use current scientific understanding along with critical and creative thinking to define a small set of principles or values that could help make sense of new capabilities opening up to humanity.

In 2006, the board of directors of the Extropy Institute made a decision to close the organization, stating that its mission was "essentially completed."

In the 90s, the Extropy Institute launched an email mailing listserv through which members could receive updates from the institute and have conversations about extropianism with other members. Notable members include:

- Julian Assange
- Nick Bostrom
- Wei Dai
- Eric Drexler
- Hal Finney
- Robin Hanson
- Todd Huffman
- Marvin Minsky
- Ray Kurzweil
- Nick Szabo
- Eliezer Yudkowsky

== See also ==
- Biopunk movement
- Cyborg anthropology
- Democratic transhumanism
- Eclipse Phase, a tabletop game which uses the philosophy in its futuristic setting.
- Effective accelerationism
- Futures studies
- Holism
- Omega Point
- Meliorism
- Negentropy
- Posthuman
- Proactionary Principle
- Russian Cosmism
- Sustainability
- Systems philosophy
- Systems thinking
- Transhumanism
