= Directed evolution (transhumanism) =

Concept in transhumanist discourses

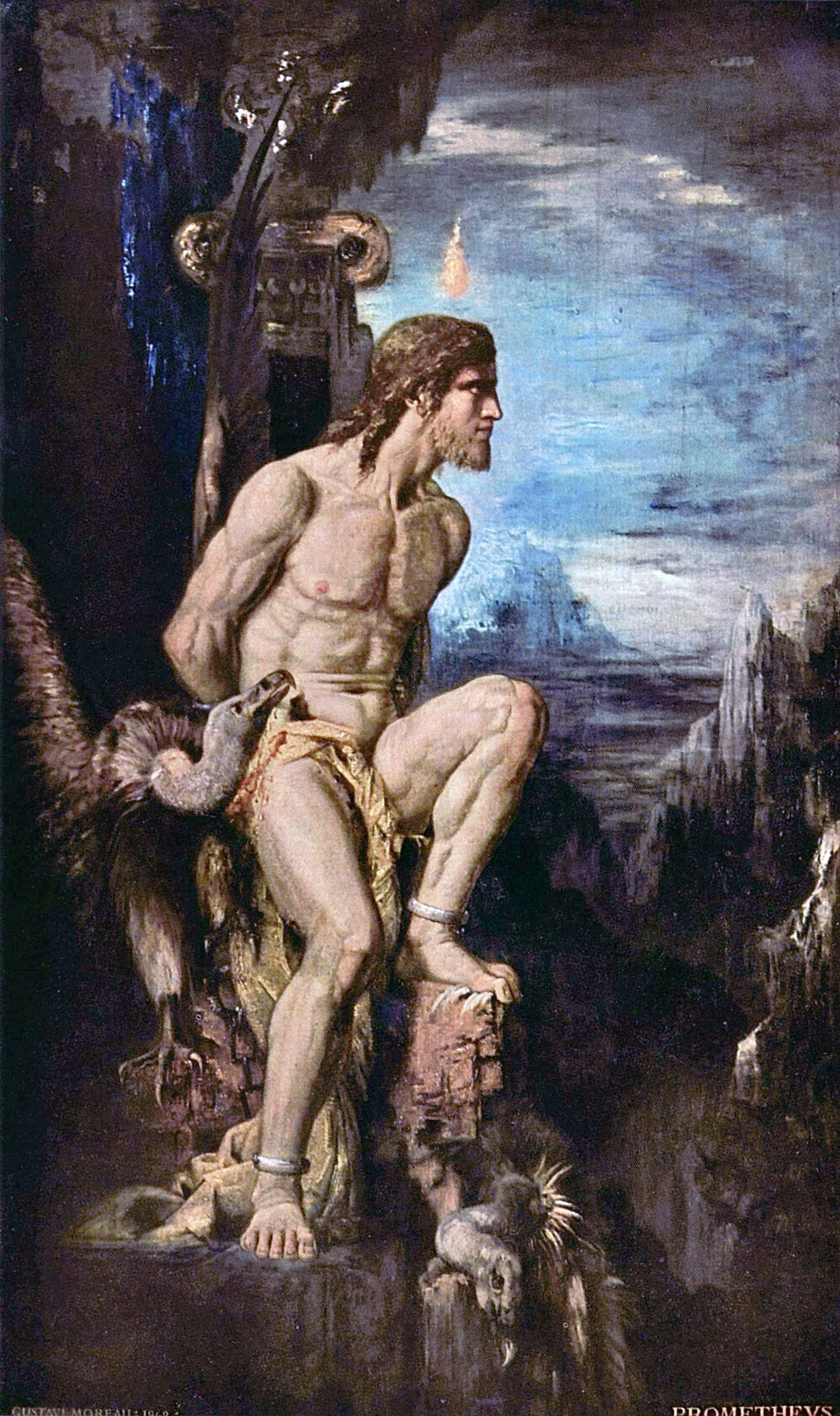
Gustave Moreau's Prometheus (1868)

The term directed evolution is used within the transhumanist community to refer to the idea of applying the principles of directed evolution and experimental evolution to the control of human evolution. Law professor Maxwell Mehlman has said that "for transhumanists, directed evolution is likened to the Holy Grail".

Riccardo Campa of the IEET wrote that "self-directed evolution" can be coupled with many different political, philosophical, and religious views within the transhumanist movement.

== Criticism of the term ==
Andrew Askland from the Sandra Day O'Connor College of Law, referring to transhumanism, says that directed evolution is problematic because evolution is ateleological and transhumanism is teleological.

UCLA biophysicist and entrepreneur Gregory Stock has defended the concept, saying in 1999 that "the human species is moving out of its childhood. It is time to acknowledge our growing powers and begin to take responsibility for them."

== Participant evolution ==
Participant evolution is an alternative term that refers to the process of deliberately redesigning the human body and brain using technological means, rather than through the natural processes of mutation and natural selection, with the goal of removing "biological limitations" and human enhancement. The idea was first put forward by Manfred Clynes and Nathan S. Kline in the 1960s in their article Cyborgs and Space, where they argued that the human species was already on a path of participant evolution.

== See also ==
- Eugenics
  - New eugenics
- Morphological freedom
- Human genetic engineering
- "Playing god" objection
- Posthumanism
