= Max More =

English-American philosopher and futurist

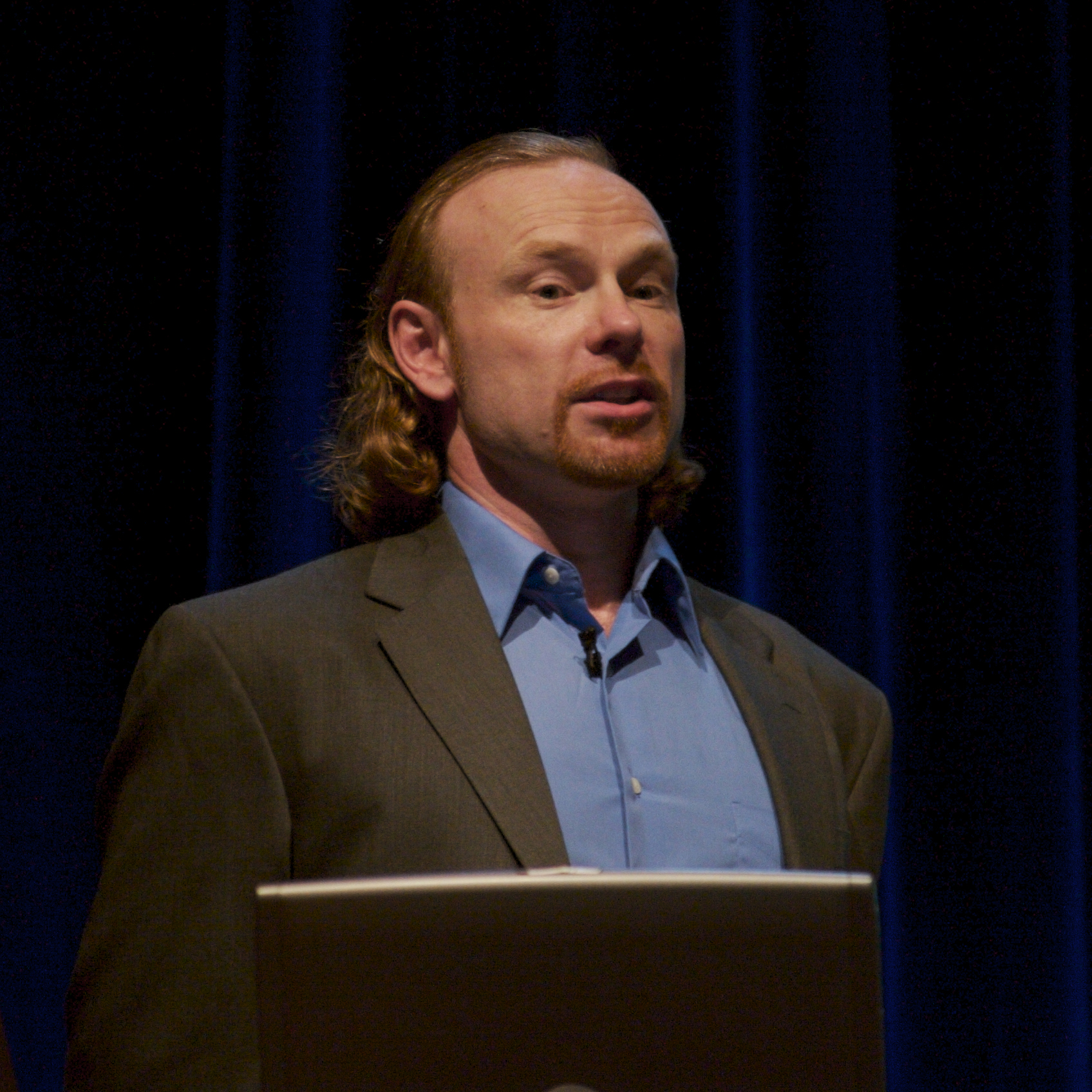
- More at the 2006 Stanford Singularity Summit
- Born: Max T. O'Connor; January 1964 (age 62)
- Education: St Anne's College, Oxford (BA); University of Southern California (PhD)
- Occupations: Philosopher and futurist
- Spouse: Natasha Vita-More
- Website: http://maxmore.com/

Max More (born Max T. O'Connor, (Note: He legally changed his name in 1990.) January 1964) is a philosopher and futurist who writes, speaks, and consults on emerging technologies. He was the president and CEO of the Alcor Life Extension Foundation between 2010 and 2020.

Born in Bristol, England, More has a degree in Philosophy, Politics and Economics from St Anne's College, Oxford (1987). His 1995 University of Southern California doctoral dissertation The Diachronic Self: Identity, Continuity, and Transformation examined several issues that concern transhumanists, including the nature of death, and what it is about each individual that continues despite great change over time. In 1996, he married transhumanist Natasha Vita-More; the couple are close collaborators on transhumanist and life extension research.

More founded the Extropy Institute and has written many articles espousing the philosophy of transhumanism and the transhumanist philosophy of extropianism, including his "Principles of Extropy". In a 1990 essay "Transhumanism: Toward a Futurist Philosophy", he introduced the term "transhumanism" in its modern sense.

== See also ==
- FM-2030
- Futures studies
- Humanity+
