= Oh Han-ki =

South Korean writer

- 오한기
- Pronunciation: [o̞ːha̠nki]
- Born: Anyang, Gyeonggi, South Korea
- Education: Dongguk University (creative writing)
- Occupation: Writer

Oh Han-ki (Korean: 오한기) is a South Korean writer. He was born in 1985 in Anyang, South Korea. He graduated in with a degree in creative writing from Dongguk University. His literary career began when his short story, "An Afternoon With a Folded Parasol" (파라솔이 접힌 오후), won the Hyundae Literary Award in 2012. He has published a short-story collection called "The Way of the Righteous" (의인법). He also won the 2016 Young Writer's Award.

When Park Seongwon was a professor of fiction writing at Dongguk University's creative writing program, Oh studied under him and became a writer. He also met his literary partner Jeong Jidon, and formed the group ‘Analrealism’. Currently, Oh works in the marketing department of a coffee franchise. He writes fiction at night. However, it seems that he recently left this position.

== Works ==
=== Short story collections ===
- Impersonation (의인법), Hyundae Munhak, 2015

=== Novels ===
- The Man Who Became a Flamingo (홍학이 된 사나이), Munhakdongne, 2016

=== Work in Translation ===
- My Clint Eastwood (English)

== Awards ==
- 2012 Hyundae Literary Award
