= Gregory Stock =

American biophysicist and author

- Citizenship: American
- Education: Johns Hopkins University (BA, MSc, PhD); Harvard Business School (MBA)

Gregory Stock is an American biophysicist, best-selling author, biotechnology entrepreneur, and the former director of the Program on Medicine, Technology and Society at UCLA School of Medicine. His interests lie in the scientific and evolutionary as well as ethical, social and political implications of today's revolutions in the life sciences and in information technology and computers.

== Life, written works, and business career ==
=== Education ===
He received an MBA from Harvard Business School in 1987, where he was a Baker Scholar and won the Freund-Porter Entrepreneurship award. Stock completed a doctorate in biophysics from Johns Hopkins University in 1977, where he received a BA and MSc in 1971.

=== Biotechnology and its impact on society ===
He has written extensively on the implications for society, medicine and business of the Human Genome Project and associated developments in molecular genetics and bioinformatics. The Storefront Genome, the symposium he convened in January 2003 to consider the broad challenges that cheap, easy access to our genetic constitutions drew wide media attention, and his 1998 look at the possibilities of manipulating the genetics of human embryos, the first major public discussion of this issue among distinguished scientists, opened a global debate on this then taboo topic.

=== Biotechnology entrepreneur ===
Stock was the CEO of Signum Biosciences. Signum Biosciences is a private biotechnology company dedicated to developing small-molecule therapeutics derived from its Signal Transduction Modulation (STM) platform to modulate signal transduction imbalances. Through research on protein networks that control biological systems, Signum is developing therapeutic candidates for Alzheimer's disease, Parkinson's, diabetes, asthma and certain skin conditions. Signum’s STM technology provides many opportunities for the development of novel consumer products and pharmaceutical candidates. Signum was founded on the science derived from basic research studying cellular signaling at the Princeton University laboratory of Dr. Jeffry Stock

He sits on the editorial board of the American Journal of Bioethics and is in the department of Pediatrics at the UCLA School of Medicine. He is a member of the Board of Directors of Napo Pharmaceuticals, a pharmaceutical company headquartered in San Francisco. He sits on the California Advisory Committee on Stem Cells and Reproductive Cloning and serves as the associate director for the Bioagenda Institute and the Center for Life Science Studies at the University of California at Berkeley.

Dr. Stock has been an invited speaker to many academic, government and business conferences. He makes regular appearances on television and radio, and has appeared on CNN, PBS, NPR and the BBC in shows including Talk of the Nation, Charlie Rose, Oprah Winfrey, Biotech Nation and Larry King.

== Public policy and activities ==
Stock was an early force in considering the implications of human germline engineering and human enhancement. Through the Program on Medicine, Technology and Society, which he founded at the UCLA School of Medicine, he organized an influential 1998 conference at UCLA: "Engineering the Human Germline," which included a panel of James Watson, French Anderson, Lee Hood and other major figures in the life sciences. The event, which attracted considerable media attention and opened up broad debate on what was then a largely taboo topic, was covered on the front page of the New York Times. Through another seminal UCLA conference, Milestones on Aging, he organized, Stock helped legitimize research to significantly extend human longevity. The event led to a follow conference he co-hosted at UC Berkeley with Bruce Ames and Aubrey de Grey, who went on to found the Methuselah Foundation, an organization that has aggressively promoted research on life extension. The activity of the MTS Program was also critical in establishing UCLA’s Center on Society and Genetics, which actively explores broad policy issues in the genomics arena.

Stock is now primarily engaged in the development of new therapeutics at Signum Biosciences, a biotech company he co-founded in 2003, but he remains active in the policy arena through UCLA's MTS Program, which he still directs, and the BioAgenda Institute, which he is the associate director of, and through various public appearances and debates. Stock has presented diverse keynotes ranging from “The Coming Era of Personalized Medicine” at Medco, “Trends in Health, Science and Nutrition” at the American Dietetic Association, "The Future of Genomics and Healthcare" at Johnson and Johnson, "The Coming Healthcare Revolution" at HIMS (Healthcare Information Management Society) and "The Evolution of the Biotech Revolution" at Applied Biosystems to "21st Century Opportunities and Challenges" at the World Future Society, "Beauty, Health and Biotech: A Look Ahead" at Fashion Group International, "Redesigning Humans: Best Hope, Worst Fear" at the TED (Technology, Education and Design) Conference, and "From Pharmacogenomics to Genetic Design" at the World Transhumanist Association. He has also been involved with broadcast media through guest appearances on shows such as the PBS documentary "Religion and Ethics: The Challenge and Ethics of Strong Biotechnology," debates on NPR's Talk of the Nation and Charlie Rose, via an online multimedia documentary he produced with funding from the Greenwall and Sloan Foundations entitled "Human Germline Engineering: Implications for Science and Society"(www.germline.ucla.edu), and in an ARTE documentary examining key figures in Biotechnology.

Stock's expertise in biotechnology, genetics and public policy in the life sciences led to his appointment on the California Advisory Committee on Stem Cells and Reproductive Cloning, Dept. of Health Services, State of California.

== Debates ==
Stock has always been a strong advocate for the aggressive implementation of new technology in the life sciences and he has publicly debated many leading figures in the bioethics community, including Francis Fukuyama, Jeremy Rifkin, Leon Kass, George Annas, Dan Callahan, Bill McKibben, Michael Sandel, William Hurlbut and Nigel Cameron. In these appearances, he has consistently argued against restrictions on life science research including funding bans on stem cell research, moratoriums on cloning, overly protective pharmaceutical regulatory controls, and efforts to constrain anti-aging research. A fellow of the World Technology Council and World Academy of Art and Science, Stock's argues in favor of the positive benefits of new technology has on human life and the role it will play on our future.

== Books ==
Stock has written works on the impact and significance of recent advances in technology and the life sciences, and several bestsellers on values and ethics. His Book of Questions series, which consists of four eclectic collections of provocative situational dilemmas, was designed to generate discussion and thought about value-laden issues. The series has sold more than three million copies in total, been translated into 17 languages, and spawned a host of imitations.

His books on technology, public policy and future human evolution are:

- Metaman:The Merging of Humans and Machines into a Global Superorganism.(1993).
- Engineering the Human Germline: An Exploration of the Science and Ethics of Altering the Genes We Pass to Our Children (2000, Oxford University Press) (Co-editor with John Campbell).
- Redesigning Humans: Our Inevitable Genetic Future (2002)
  Redesigning Humans won the Kistler Award Kistler Prize for science writing. Stock has also written numerous articles and papers on these topics.
- The Book of Questions (1987) ISBN 978-0-89480-320-8
- Business, Politics, and Ethics: The Book of Questions (1991, Workman. NY.)
- Love and Sex: The Book of Questions. (1989, Workman. NY.)
- The Kids' Book of Questions. (1988, Workman. NY.)

Stock currently serves on the editorial Board of Rejuvination Science, the International Journal of Bioethics, the Journal of Evolution and Technology, and the American Journal of Bioethics.

== Boards ==
- Board of Directors, Signum Biosciences Inc.
- Board of Directors, Napo Pharmaceuticals Inc

== Selected articles ==
- Full List Available on Ucla Website
- Germinal Choice Technology and the Future of Human Reproduction - BioMedicine Online (March 2005)
- ‘Redesigning Humans’: Taking Charge of Our Own Heredity, review - The Lancet (April 2002)
- ‘Redesigning Humans’: Taking Charge of Our Own Heredity review - New York Times (August 25, 2002)
- EMBO Reports - EMBO (2002)
- Talking Stock - Spiked (June 25, 2002)
- Profile - Wall Street Journal (June 13, 2002)
- GENETIC ENGINEERING:Toward a New Human Species? review - Science (June 2002)
- Our shiny happy clone future - Salon.com (April 2002)
- Bio-Luddites square up to friends of Frankenstein - The Times Higher Education Supplement (May 17, 2002)
- Homo perfectus - Los Angeles Times Review of Books (Sunday, May 5, 2002)
- Visions of the future - Chicago Tribune (May 2002)
- The Remastered Race - Wired (April 2002)
- Cloning Research Commentary - Los Angeles Times (December 2, 2001)
- Human Germline Engineering:Best Hope or Worst Fear? Germline
