= Natasha Vita-More =

American artist and futurist

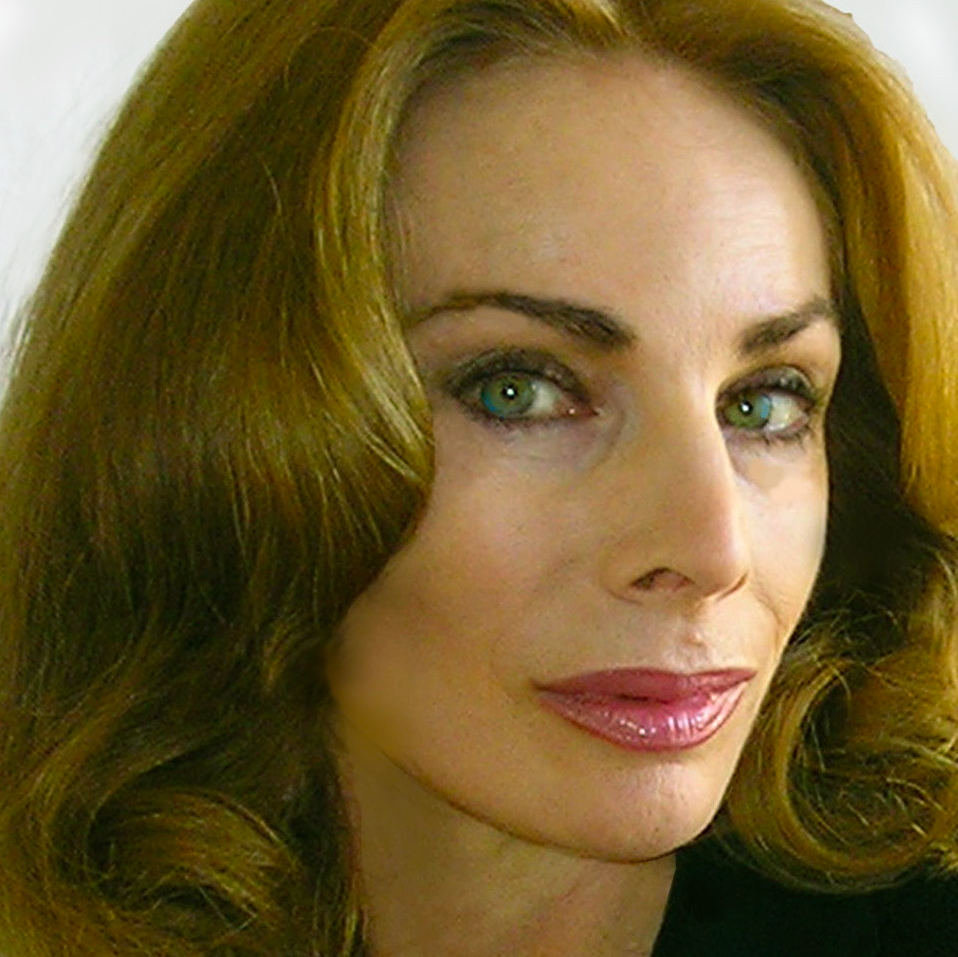
- Natasha Vita-More in 2010
- Born: Bronxville, New York, U.S.
- Education: University of Memphis (BFA); University of Houston (MSc); University of Plymouth (MPhil), (PhD)
- Occupations: Artist, futurist, author
- Known for: Primo Posthuman, transhumanism

Natasha Vita-More is an American futurist, theorist, author, and performing artist whose interdisciplinary career spans visual and performing arts, academic scholarship, scientific research, and organizational leadership. Her work addresses human futures, longevity, artificial intelligence, nanotechnology, and the relationship between emerging technologies and human evolution.

She is known for Primo Posthuman, a conceptual design for a whole-body prosthetic that she created in the 1990s, and for her work with the Extropy Institute and Humanity+.

== Early life and education ==
Vita-More was born in Bronxville, New York. Vita-More studied at Accademia di Belle Arti in Ravenna, Italy (1977) after graduating with a Bachelor of Fine Art (1973). She earned a Master of Science in Future Studies at the University of Houston (2006) and a Master of Philosophy from the University of Plymouth, UK. Vita-More was awarded a Ph.D. from the University of Plymouth, United Kingdom. Her Ph.D. thesis focused on human enhancement and radical life extension.

== Career ==
Between 1987 and 1993 she was the host and producer of TransCentury Update, a cable TV show that aired in Los Angeles and Telluride, Colorado. Between 2001 and 2004, she was the President of the Extropy Institute. She subsequently served as chair and executive director of Humanity+, becoming president emeritus in August 2024. She participated in the Cambridge Union Immortality Debate of 2017.

Vita-More served as a professor at the University of Advancing Technology.

== Work ==
In 1983, Vita-More wrote the Transhumanist Manifesto, a copy of which was on board the Cassini–Huygens Saturn mission in 1997.

In 1997 she designed Primo Posthuman, a conceptual design for a whole-body prosthetic, which depicted how a human might look in the future with technological enhancements. The design has been discussed in scholarship on posthuman aesthetics, including a 2016 article by Francesca Ferrando in Palgrave Communications.

Vita-More participated in the exhibition Evolution Haute Couture: Art and Science in the Post-Biological Age (2009), curated by Dmitry Bulatov.

She authored Create / Recreate: the 3rd Millennial Culture on the emerging cybernetic culture and the future of humanism and the arts and sciences.

Her project Primo 3M+ 2001, a future physique design for superlongevity, is based on nanotechnology and AI.

In 2014, Vita-More and Daniel Barranco undertook research on the persistence of long-term memory in the nematode Caenorhabditis elegans following vitrification and revival. Their findings were published in 2015.

=== Books and publications ===
- The Transhumanist Reader: Classical and Contemporary Essays on the Science, Technology, and Philosophy of the Human Future (2013), co-edited with Max More.
- Create/Recreate: The 3rd Millennium Culture (1999).
- Unbounded Existence: AI, Nanorobots, and Computational Simulation (2023), a chapter in Humanity In-Between and Beyond.
- D’Homo Sapient à Homo Sapient (2024).

=== Selected academic works ===
- Vita-More, N., and Barranco, D. (2015). "Persistence of Long-Term Memory in Vitrified and Revived Caenorhabditis elegans". Rejuvenation Research, 18(5), 458–463. doi:10.1089/rej.2014.1636.
- Vita-More, N. (2010). "Epoch of plasticity: The metaverse as a vehicle for cognitive enhancement". Metaverse Creativity, 1(1), 61–71. doi:10.1386/mvcr.1.1.61_1.
