= Metaman =

1993 book by Gregory Stock

Metaman: The Merging of Humans and Machines into a Global Superorganism
- Author: Gregory Stock
- Language: English
- Published: 1993
- Publisher: Simon & Schuster
- Publication place: United States
- ISBN: 067170723X

Metaman: The Merging of Humans and Machines into a Global Superorganism is a 1993 book by author Gregory Stock. The title refers to a superorganism comprising humanity and its technology.

== Content ==
In his book, Stock claims that humanity as a whole can be seen as a collective organism which he calls Metaman. He compares individual humans with cells which work together and communicate on a global scale thanks to advances in technology. Stock sees mass media as the Metaman's consciousness, libraries as its memory and transport as its nervous system.

According to Stock, the Metaman is constantly evolving. Metaman transforms the planetary environment and creates new biological communities which are completely dependent on the Metaman. It changes humans which begin to merge with machines. Its evolution is accelerating, and it might soon reproduce into outer space. Stock thinks that this growth is beneficial, and Metaman will overcome the negative natural processes, such as floods or famines.

== Criticism ==
Stock does not explore the negative sides of such entity as Metaman. Kenneth Haygood says that Stock only provided the data to support particular points and did not examine forces which would interfere with his concept: "Readers of this journal with general systems theory and related ideas may find that all of Stock's bits and pieces of data, while relevant to a particular point, had the overall effect of diverting the reader from a more penetrating examination of the concept and its implications."

In her review, Patric Hedlund opposes Stock's optimistic view and provides counterexamples, such as Yugoslav Wars. She argues that Metaman's awareness might not be sufficient to prevent its self-destruction.
