= Straw Dogs (book) =

Philosophy Book Written by John Gray

Straw Dogs: Thoughts on Humans and Other Animals
- Author: John Gray
- Language: English
- Genre: Philosophy
- Published: 2002
- Publisher: Granta Books
- Publication place: United Kingdom
- Media type: Print, e-book
- Pages: 246
- ISBN: 1-86207-512-3

Straw Dogs: Thoughts on Humans and Other Animals is a 2002 book by the philosopher John Gray. In the book, Gray attacks humanism and traces its origins back to Christianity. The book is divided into six chapters, which in turn are subdivided into short essays on different topics.

Gray attacks humanism as a worldview in conflict with the view of humanity as part of the evolution of life on the planet. He sees humanism as a secular version of the Christian view of humans as differentiated from the natural world. Gray blames humanism, and its central view of humanity, for much of the destruction of the natural world, and sees technology as just a tool by which humans will continue destroying the planet and each other. He advocates James Lovelock's Gaia Hypothesis, whereby the natural world self-regulates to maintain the conditions of life in the planet, without any special place for humanity in it.

The Tao Te Ching also makes use of the phrase straw dog to describe the non-humanity (不仁 bu ren) of Heaven and Earth.

== Reception ==
Straw Dogs has received particular praise from English author J. G. Ballard, who wrote that the book "challenges most of our assumptions about what it means to be human, and convincingly shows that most of them are delusions" and described it "a powerful and brilliant book", "an essential guide to the new millennium" and "the most exhilarating book I have read since Richard Dawkins's The Selfish Gene." Another English author, Will Self called the book "a contemporary work of philosophy devoid of jargon, wholly accessible, and profoundly relevant to the rapidly evolving world we live in" and wrote "I read it once, I read it twice and took notes. I arranged to meet its author so I could publicize the book – I thought it that good."

In 2002 Straw Dogs was named a book of the year by J. G. Ballard in The Daily Telegraph; by George Walden in The Sunday Telegraph; by Will Self, Joan Bakewell, Jason Cowley and David Marquand in the New Statesman; by Andrew Marr in The Observer; by Jim Crace in The Times; by Hugh Lawson Tancred in The Spectator; by Richard Holloway in the Glasgow Herald; and by Sue Cook in The Sunday Express.

The book has been criticised by Terry Eagleton, who has written: "mixing nihilism and New Ageism in equal measure, Gray scoffs at the notion of progress for 150 pages before conceding that there is something to be said for anaesthetics. The enemy in his sights is not so much a straw dog as a straw man: the kind of starry-eyed rationalist who passed away with John Stuart Mill, but who he has to pretend still rules the world".

The academic and author Danny Postel of the University of Denver also took issue with Straw Dogs. Postel stated that Gray's claim that environmental destruction was the result of humanity's flawed nature would be "welcome news to the captains of industry and the architects of the global economy; the ecological devastation they leave in their wake, according to Gray, has nothing to do with their exploits." Postel also claimed that too much of Straw Dogs rested on "blanket assertion", and criticised Gray's use of the term "plague of people" as an outdated "neo-Malthusian persiflage about overpopulation". Postel strongly condemned Gray for outlining "complete political passivity. There is no point whatsoever in our attempting to make the world a less cruel or more livable place."
