= Meliorism =

Idea in metaphysical thinking

William James was an early adherent to meliorism as a halfway position between metaphysical optimism and pessimism.

Meliorism (Latin melior, better) is the idea that progress is a real concept and that humans can interfere with natural processes in order to improve the world.

Meliorism, as a conception of the person and society, is at the foundation of contemporary liberal democracy and human rights and is a basic component of liberalism.

Another important understanding of the meliorist tradition comes from the American Pragmatic tradition, which can be found in the works of Lester Frank Ward, William James, and John Dewey. In James' works, however, meliorism does not point to progressivism and/or optimism. For James, meliorism stands in the middle between optimism and pessimism and treats the salvation of the world as a probability rather than a certainty or impossibility. In the case of a meliorist praxis, the activist contemporary of the Pragmatists Jane Addams stripped progressive ideals of any elitist privilege, calling for a "lateral progress" whose concern was squarely with the common people.

Meliorism has also been used by Arthur Caplan to describe positions in bioethics that are in favor of ameliorating conditions that cause suffering, even if the conditions have long existed (e.g., being in favor of cures for common diseases, being in favor of serious anti-aging therapies as they are developed).

A closely related concept, discussed by Jean-Jacques Rousseau and Marquis de Condorcet, is that of perfectibility of humans. Condorcet's statement, "Such is the object of the work I have undertaken; the result of which will be to show, from reasoning and from facts, that no bounds have been fixed to the improvement of the human faculties; that the perfectibility of man is absolutely indefinite; that the progress of this perfectibility, henceforth above the control of every power that would impede it, has no other limit than the duration of the globe upon which nature has placed us." anticipates James' meliorism. Rousseau's treatment is somewhat weaker.

Modern thinkers in this tradition are Hans Rosling and Max Roser. Roser expressed a melioristic position in the mission statement for Our World in Data. He said that all three statements are true at the same time: "The world is much better. The world is awful. The world can be much better." Like William James before him, Rosling held a halfway position between optimism and pessimism that emphasized humanity's capacity to improve the world.

== See also ==
- Antinaturalism (sociology)
- Extropianism
- Idea of Progress
- Techno-progressivism
- Teleology
- The Ultimate Resource
- Transhumanism
- Whig history
- Bioconservatism
