= Jeong Jidon =

South Korean writer

Jeong Jidon is a South Korean writer. He started his literary career by winning the New Writer's Award from Literature and Society with “Nunmeon bueong-i” (눈먼 부엉이 The Blind Owl). He has called himself an ‘analrealist’. The members of this group are writers Oh Han-ki, Lee Sangwoo, Park Solmoe, and critics Kang Dongho, Geum Jeongyeon.

== Life ==
Jeong Jidon was born in Daegu, South Korea, and studied film and creative writing in university. Through the influence of his film buff father, who loved classic French films with Alain Delon and Jean Gabin, he grew up dreaming to be a film director, subscribing to film magazines from when we was in middle school. While studying film in university, he suddenly felt that the atmosphere of the film set did not agree with him. So he began writing scenarios, then eventually began writing fiction. To realize his fantasy of wandering around empty buildings at night with a flashlight, he once worked as a night watchman for four months.

Though all writers are, Jeong Jidon is known to have read extensively. When young, he read many genre novels such as detective novels and martial arts novels. After turning twenty, he explored Korean literature and classic literature from around the world. As writers that have influenced him, he has mentioned W. G. Sebald, Roberto Bolaño, and Gustave Flaubert. After his debut, Jeong Jidon has won the Munhakdongne Young Writers’ Award, and the Moonji Literature Prize, gathering attention from readers and critics.

== Writing ==
Jeong Jidon's characteristic is that he creates a world by cleverly fabricating based on literary facts. Also, another characteristic is that he references sentences from the countless books that he has read, and then his sentences overlap on top of them, creating an atmosphere of déjàvu and fantasy. Therefore, his work gives the feeling of reading nonfiction. On Jeong Jidon's work “Geonchuk-inya hyeokmyeong-inya” (건축이냐 혁명이냐 Architecture? Or Revolution?), writer Jung Young Moon has said that it is “an exemplary model of intelligent fiction that skillfully combines facts and fiction”. Critic Hwang Jongyeon has highly praised the book as a “monstrosity of a work” that “depicts brilliant acrobatics in the gap between history and fiction.” In contrast, Writer Ku Hyoseo, who was among the judges, has called this work a “cruel joke”. Critic Kwon Huicheol has said “I have not been able to thoroughly figure out the true value of this work”. Writer Shin Kyung-sook has written in her commentary that she is not able to readily agree with the appraisal of others. As such, Jeong Jidon is a writer who draws dispute not only amongst readers, but also writers.

Jeong Jidon says the following on his work. “Ideas divide us and dreams unite us. What I do best is citation. Literature is like citing the world. (Omitted) Short and reverse short. Analrealism is the citation of literature. Therefore, analrealism is the citation of the citation of the world.” As this cryptic phrase is describing, the core aspect of Jeong Jidon's work is not in its theme or meaning, but it style.

== Works ==
=== Short story collections ===
- Naega Ssa-woodeut-i (내가 싸우듯이 Like How I Fight), Moonji Publishing, 2016.

== Awards ==
- 2013 New Writer's Award from Literature and Society.
- 2015 Munhakdongne Young Writers’ Award.
- 2016 Moonji Literature Prize.
