= Alarmism =

Excessive or exaggerated alarm about a real or imagined threat

Alarmism is excessive or exaggerated alarm of a real or imagined threat. Alarmism connotes attempts to excite fears or giving warnings of great danger in a manner that is amplified, overemphasized or unwarranted. In the news media, alarmism can often be found in the form of yellow journalism where reports sensationalise a story to exaggerate small risks.

== Alarmist personality ==
The alarmist person is subject to the cognitive distortion of catastrophizing – of always expecting the worst of possible futures.

They may also be seeking to preserve feelings of omnipotence by trying to generate anxiety, apprehension and concern in others.

== See also ==
- 2009 flu pandemic
- 2012 phenomenon
- Cassandra complex
- Climate alarmism
- Culture of fear – fear and anxiety in public discourse
- False alarm
- Fearmongering – use of fear to influence opinions
- Hypochondriasis – excessive fear of illness and physical harm
- Mass hysteria – public fear in large populations
- Moral panic – threat to societal values
- Sociology of disaster – a special branch of sociology
- The Boy Who Cried Wolf – fable about false alarmism
- The Sky Is Falling – fable about alarmism
- Safety culture
- Conspiracy theory
