= Signum Biosciences =

Multi-level marketing company

Signum Biosciences, Inc. is a dietary supplement company located in Boulder, Colorado.

== History ==
Signum was founded in 2003 by Maxwell Stock and his father Jeffrey B. Stock in Monmouth Junction, NJ. In 2020 the company relocated to Boulder, Colorado.

Signum agreed in 2019 to stop making certain claims about its EHT supplement, and to stop allowing its multi-level marketing partner firm Neora (formerly Nerium International) to make such claims.

=== Neora (Nerium) partnership and FTC injunction ===
In 2015 Signum partnered with Neora, LLC (then known as Nerium International) to launch a dietary supplement called eicosanoyl-5-hydroxytryptamide (EHT). EHT is derived from coffee and inhibits demethylation of the enzyme protein phosphatase 2 (PPP2CA; PP2A). In October 2019 the Federal Trade Commission won a permanent injunction against Signum BioSciences, Signum Nutralogix, and affiliated companies including Neora. The injunction prohibits claims or representations of EHT's efficacy in treating or mitigating Alzheimer's disease, Parkinson's disease, or brain injury including CTE and concussion, unless those claims are backed up by randomized, double-blind, placebo-controlled human clinical testing.
