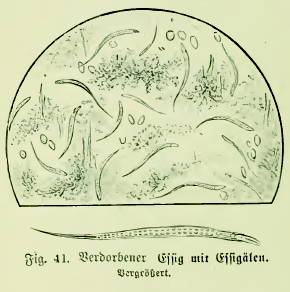
- Illustration of vinegar eels

Scientific classification
- Kingdom: Animalia
- Phylum: Nematoda
- Class: Chromadorea
- Order: Rhabditida
- Family: Panagrolaimidae
- Genus: Turbatrix
- Species: T. aceti

Binomial name
- Turbatrix aceti (Müller, 1783)

Synonyms
- Anguillula aceti

= Turbatrix aceti =

Vinegar eels

Species of roundworm

Turbatrix aceti (vinegar eels, vinegar nematode, Anguillula aceti) are free-living nematodes that feed on a microbial culture called mother of vinegar (used to create vinegar) and may be found in unfiltered vinegar. They were discovered by Pierre Borel in 1656.

They are exceptionally tolerant of variation in acidity and alkalinity and they may be able to tolerate a wider range than any other species, being able to survive from pH 1.6 to 11.

Vinegar eels are often given to fry (baby fish) as a live food, like microworms. Although they are harmless and non-parasitic, leaving eels in vinegar is considered objectionable (for example, in the United States they are not permitted in vinegar destined for American consumers). Manufacturers normally filter and pasteurize their product prior to bottling, destroying the live bacterial and yeast culture that these nematodes require for sustenance.

At high concentration near a boundary, vinegar eels synchronize their undulations, forming a collective wave.

Aging in T. aceti is associated with a decline in the ability to repair DNA damage, a finding that is consistent with the theory that DNA damage contributes to aging.
