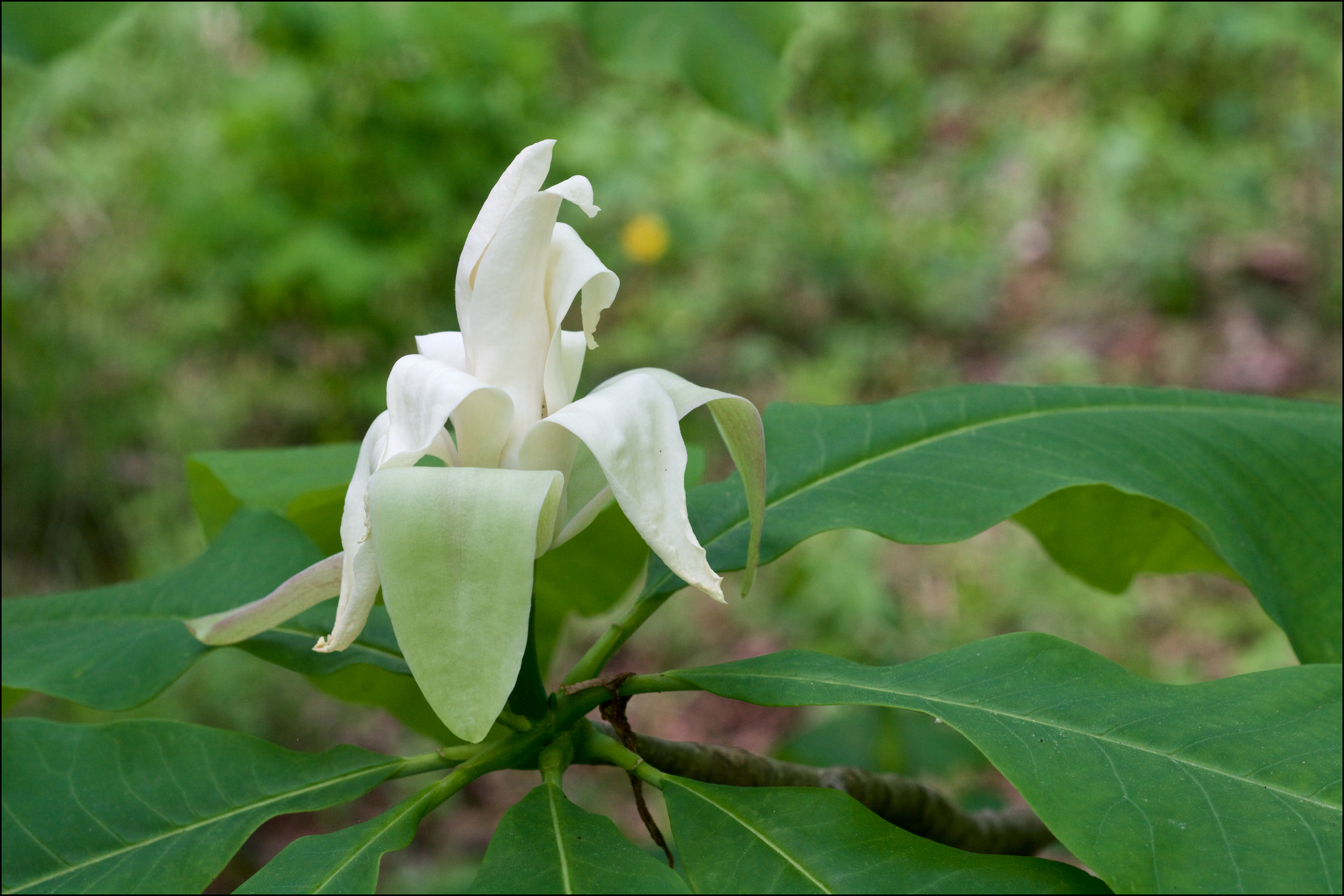

Conservation status
- Least Concern (IUCN 3.1)

Scientific classification
- Kingdom: Plantae
- Clade: Tracheophytes
- Clade: Angiosperms
- Clade: Magnoliids
- Order: Magnoliales
- Family: Magnoliaceae
- Genus: Magnolia
- Subgenus: Magnolia subg. Magnolia
- Section: Magnolia sect. Rhytidospermum
- Subsection: Magnolia subsect. Rhytidospermum
- Species: M. tripetala

Binomial name
- Magnolia tripetala (L.) L.
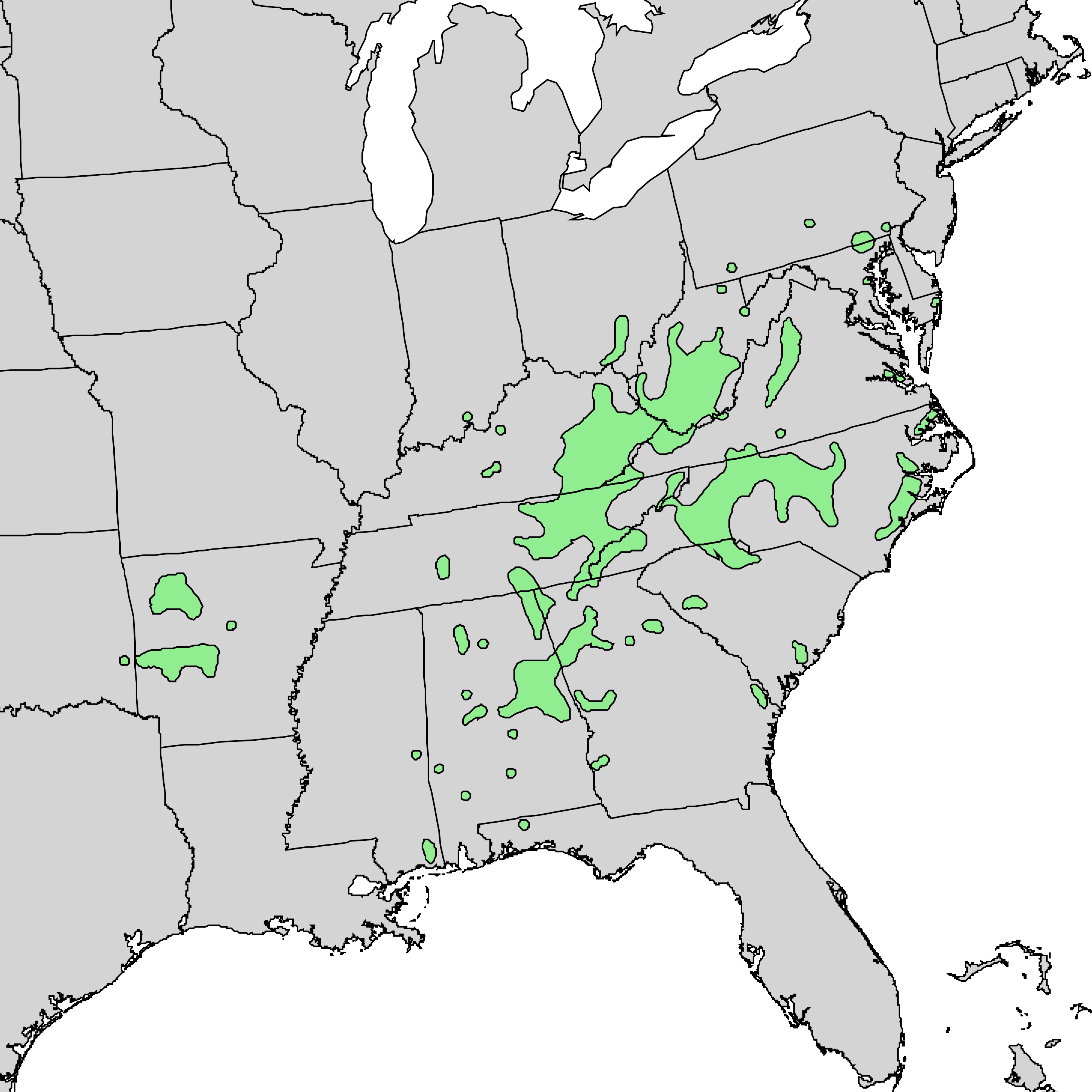
- Generalized natural range of Magnolia tripetala

Synonyms
- Kobus tripetala (L.) P.Parm.; Magnolia frondosa Salisb.; M. michauxii Fraser ex Thouin; M. umbellata Steud.; M. umbrella Desr.; M. virginiana var. tripetala L. (basionym)

= Magnolia tripetala =

Species of tree

Magnolia tripetala, commonly called umbrella magnolia or simply umbrella-tree, is a deciduous tree native to the eastern United States in the Appalachian Mountains, the Ozarks, and the Ouachita Mountains. The name "umbrella tree" derives from the fact that the large leaves are clustered at the tips of the branches forming an umbrella-shaped structure.

== Description ==
Umbrella magnolias have large shiny leaves 30–50 cm long, spreading from stout stems. In a natural setting the umbrella magnolia can grow 15 m tall. The flowers are large, appear in the spring, malodorous, 15–25 cm diameter, with six to nine creamy-white tepals and a large red style, which later develops into a red fruit (an aril) 10 cm long, containing several red seeds. These trees are attractive and easy to grow. The leaves turn yellow in the autumn. The leaves are clustered at the tip of the stem with very short internodes. The tree has reddish cone-shaped fruit, is shade tolerant, has shallow spreading roots, and is pollinated by beetles.

Leaves on M. tripetala trees are alternate, simple, and oblong. They are a dark green on top and pale green underneath the leaves. These leaves are clustered at the ends of branches, giving them the appearance of an umbrella. The leaves and arrangement resemble their relative M. macrophylla. These trees are naturally in rich and moist woods, along slopes, streams and ravines. The bark is thin and gray, mostly smooth and can have raised lenticels. Trees typically grow from single stems, though multiple stems are not uncommon. The flowers on M. tripetala have been described to have unpleasant smells but are not toxic to organisms. These trees grow at a moderate rate during the spring season.

== Taxonomy ==
The name M. tripetala was originally described by Linnaeus in his Systema Naturae in 1759. It is most commonly known as the umbrella magnolia or the umbrella tree. Tripetala comes from Latin and means "three petals". This naming convention was used for the three petal-like sepals of the tree's flowers. Magnolia tripetala is the accepted name of the species but has gone through multiple authors naming the species differently. Synonyms for M. tripetala include Kobus tripetala, Magnolia frondosa, Magnolia umbrella, Magnolia virginiana var. tripetala, and Magnolia umbrella var. tripetala.

== Distribution and habitat ==
Umbrella magnolias have a native range from New York state to southern Florida. This range also expands as far west as Arkansas and parts of Oklahoma. It is located in deciduous forests of the Appalachian Mountains. Research has shown the species to be non-native to northern states such as in New England, and only being a recent arrival. This species has been cultivated in locations outsides its natural range, and has spread from these locations to nearby woodlands. Magnolia tripetala has been observed in forests outside its native range in multiple instances. Single individuals and small populations have been observed near areas where M. tripetala is in cultivation. Magnolia tripetala has been given the FACU wetland status, tending to prefer average to dry soil. The trees have low tolerance to drought and fire.

== Reproduction ==
Magnolia tripetala in cultivation can produce low viability pollen (9.4-31.7%). Actual seed productivity of the M. tripetala is less than their potential productivity. However, M. tripetala are characterized by a high seed germination rates, up to 94%. Optimal seed germination conditions for M. tripetala are protected ground or a greenhouse and stratification at 4 °C for 30 days.

== Notable trees ==
The largest known Magnolia tripetala is 15.2 m in height with a trunk diameter of 87 cm in Bucks County, Pennsylvania.

== Uses ==
Magnolia tripetala contains a substance called ethyl acetate in its branches, and this substance displays nematicidal activity. This activity allows it to specifically resist Bursaphelenchus xylophilus, Panagrellus redivivus, and Caenorhabditis elegans.

Magnolia tripetala has been used as a parent with Magnolia obovata (Japanese cucumber tree), resulting in the hybrid Magnolia x pruhoniciana, an ornamental plant. This hybrid is named for the park for which it was first discovered, Prühonice Park in the Czech Republic. The hybrid has resulted in multiple hybrid variants, including the named 'Silk Road' and 'Silver Parasol' cultivars. The variants are described to be deciduous, medium trees with elliptic to ovate leaves. The leaves are 20-45cm by 10-22cm and the flowers are white, 16-25cm across at the end of branches. The cultivars have fruits with features such as number of follicles or stamen scars that are intermediate between the parent species.

Umbrella magnolia leaves are eaten by a variety of animals. They often grow under the canopy of larger trees and support biodiversity in forested areas. These trees are notably used as specimen trees for their unique foliage. Magnolia tripetala is used as an ornamental in urban areas and used as focal trees in the garden setting.

== Gallery ==
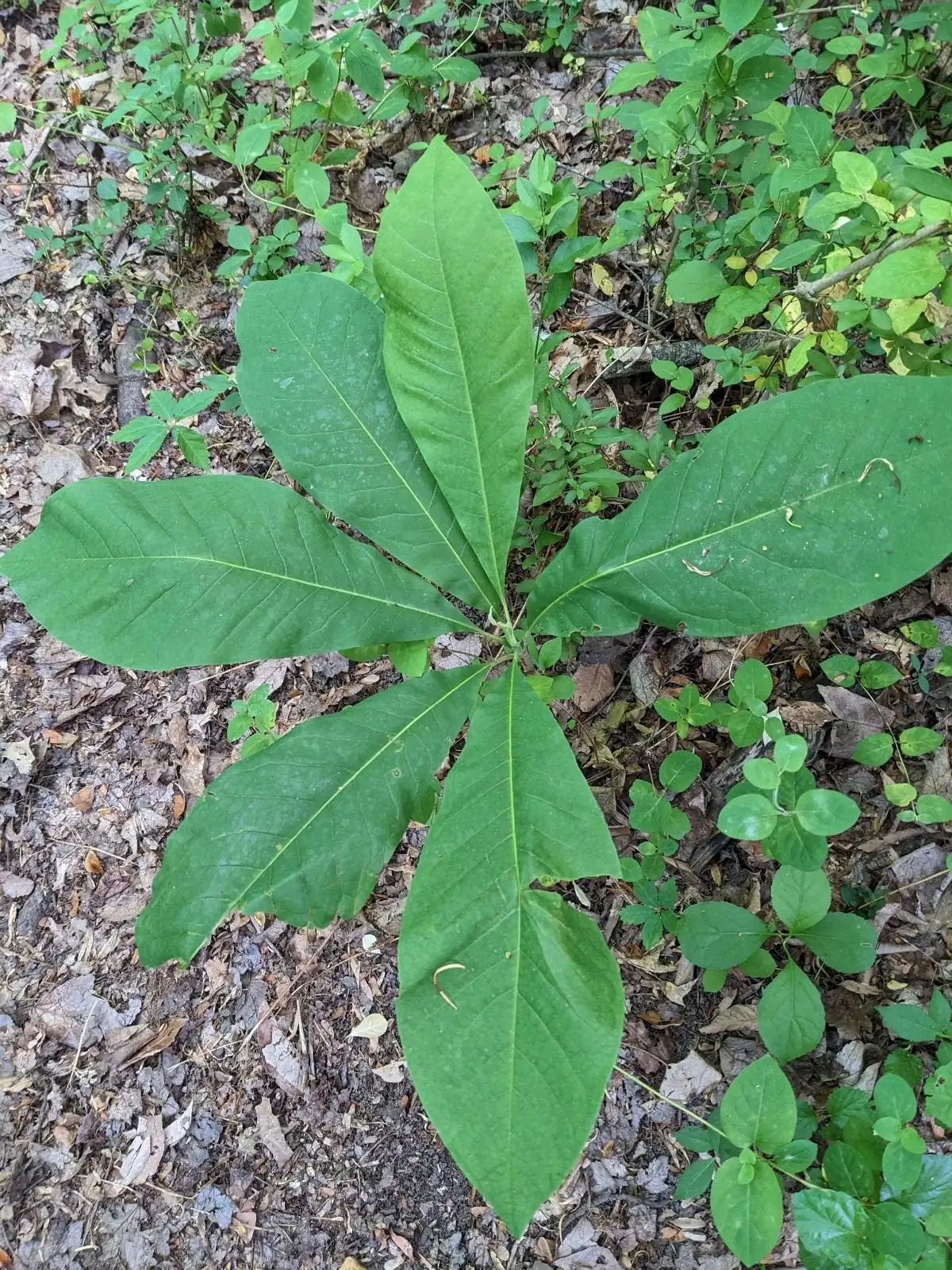
Seedling

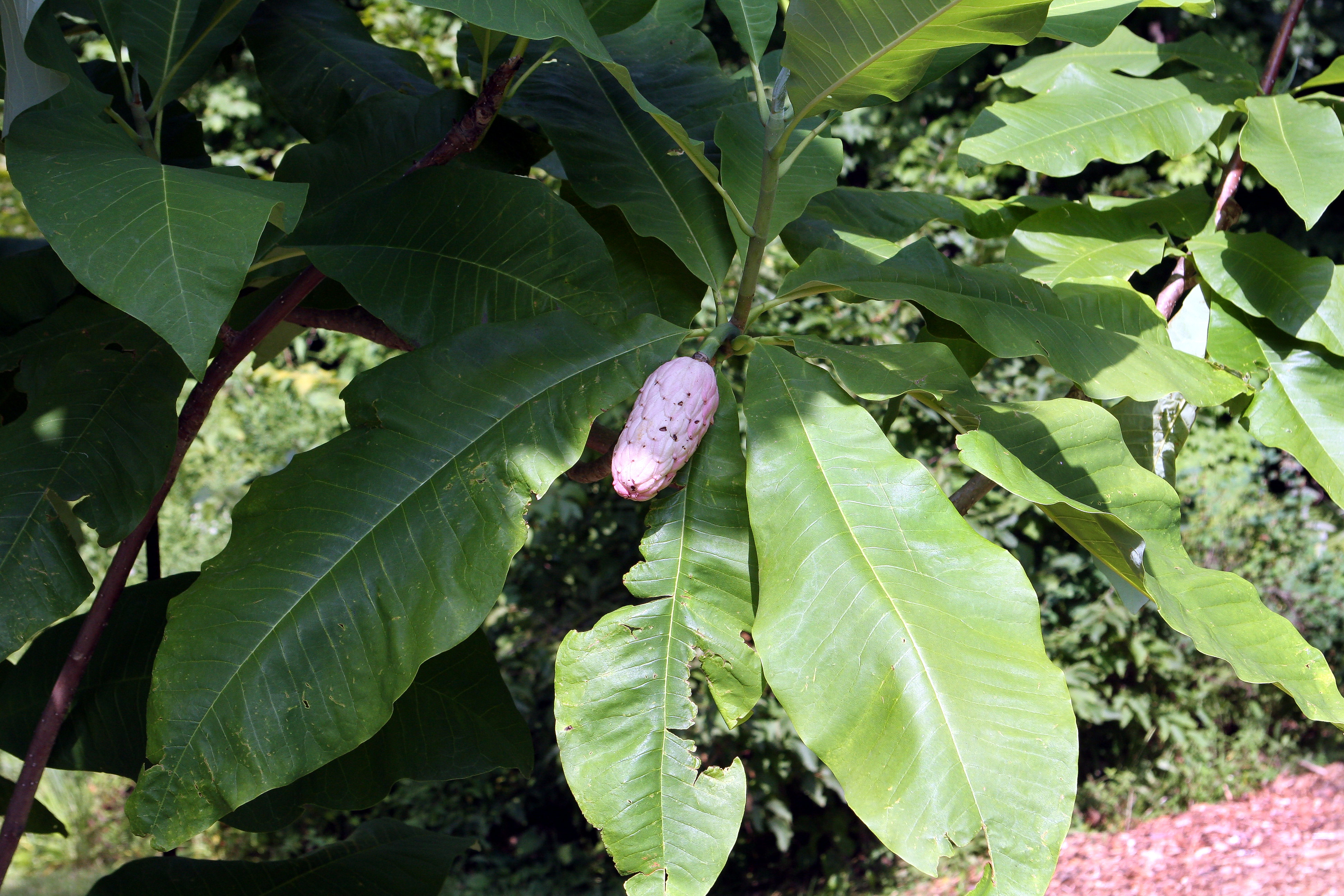
Immature fruit and leaf details

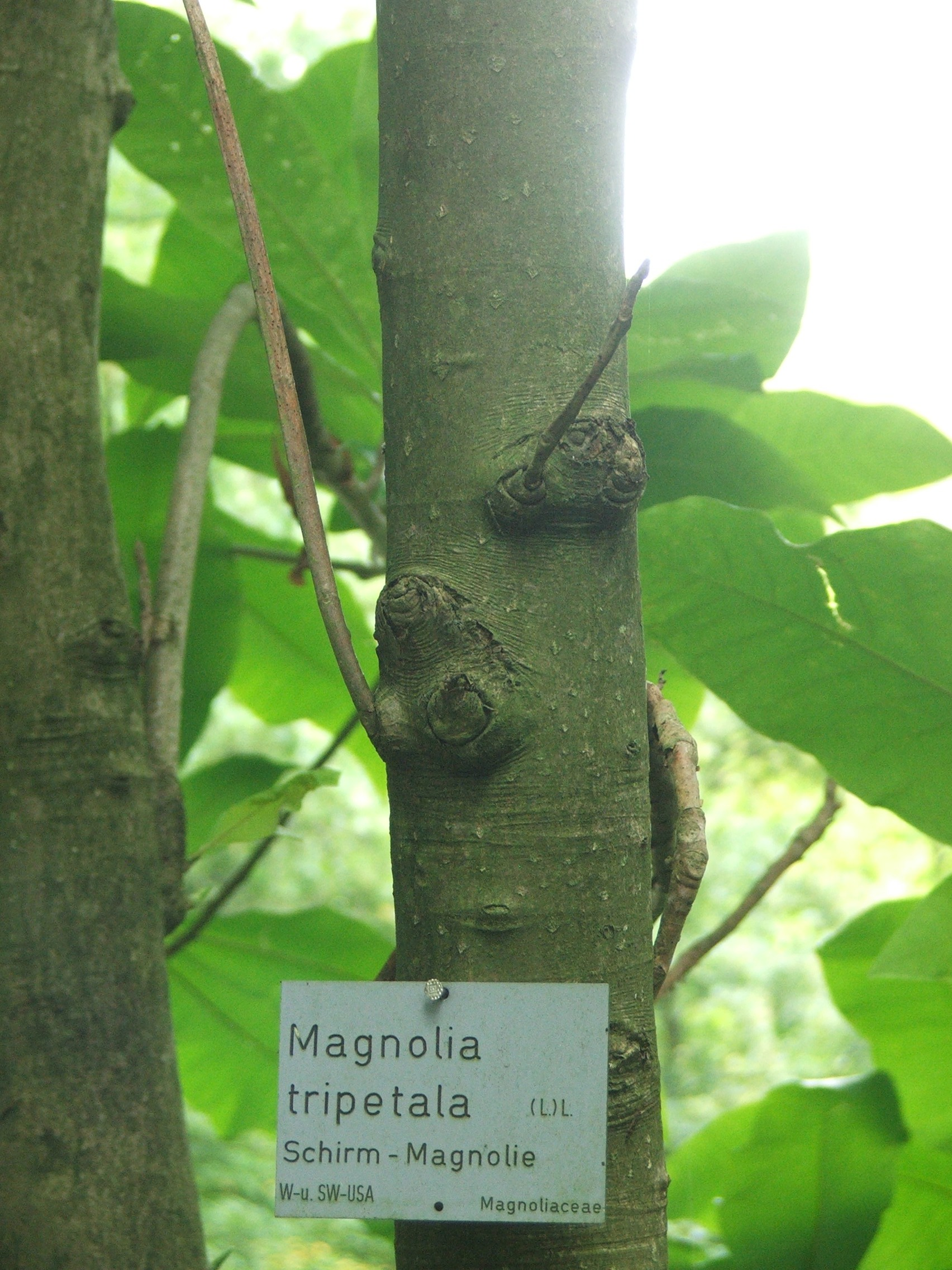
Tree

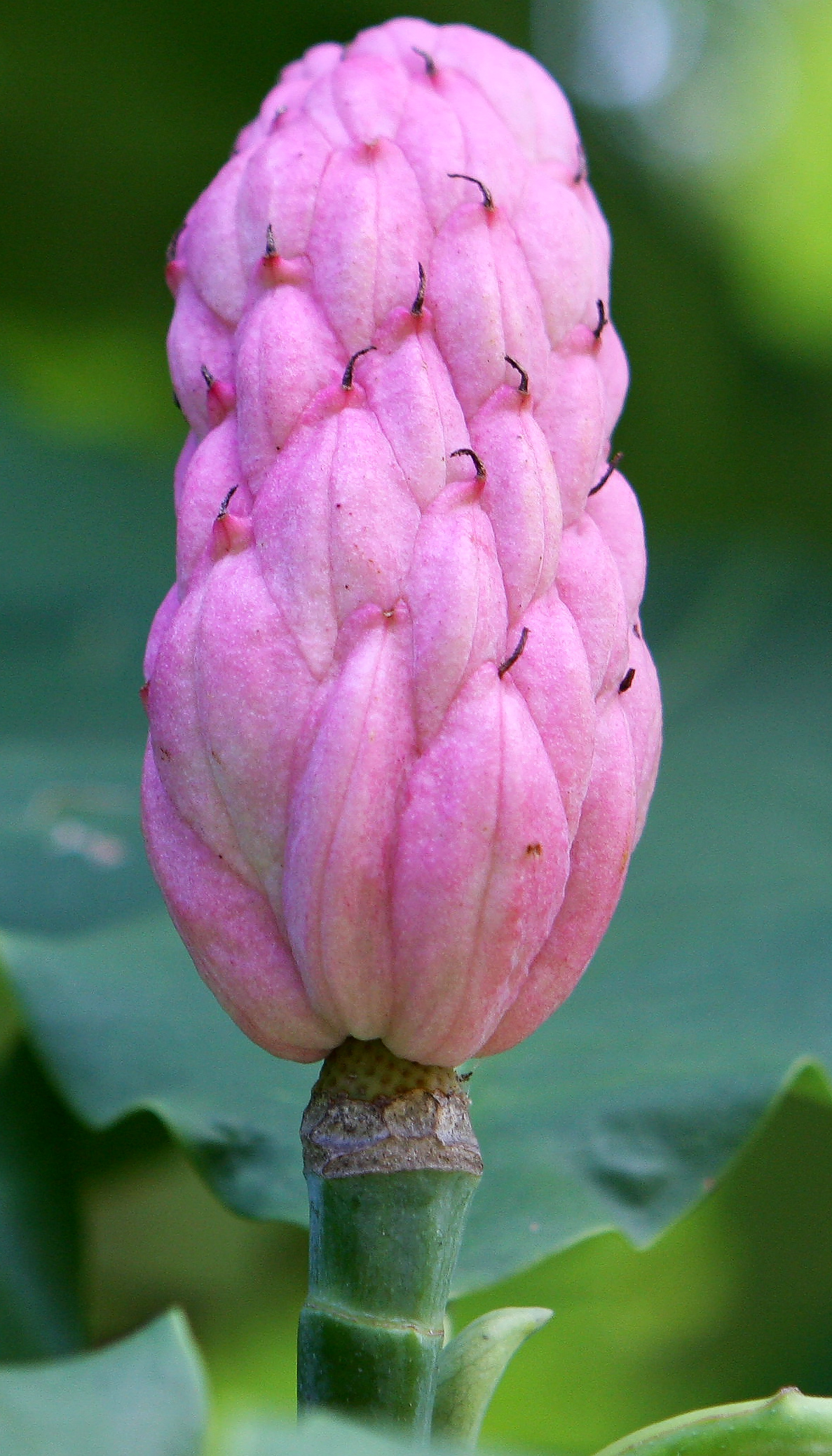
Immature fruit

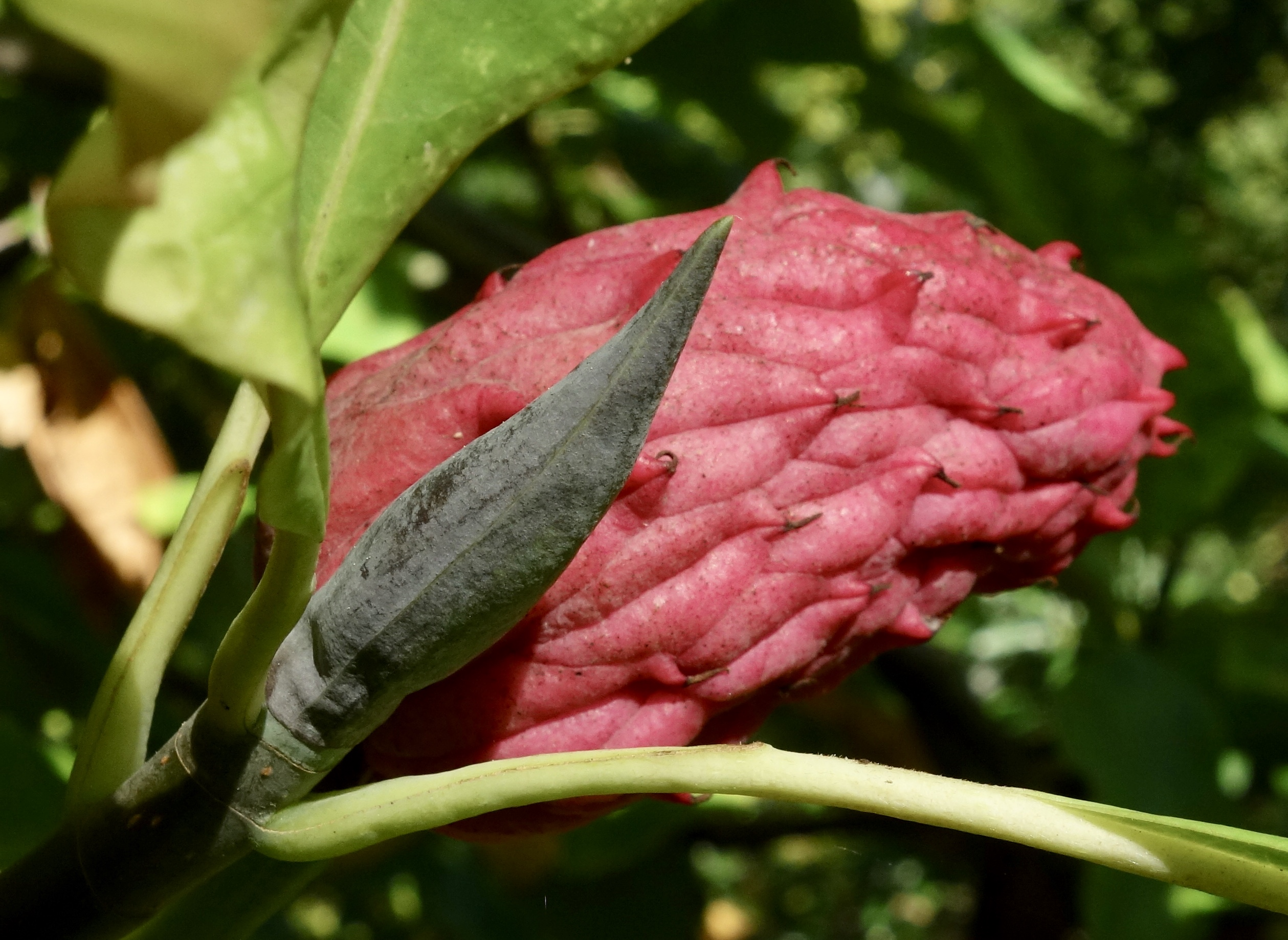
Nearly mature fruit

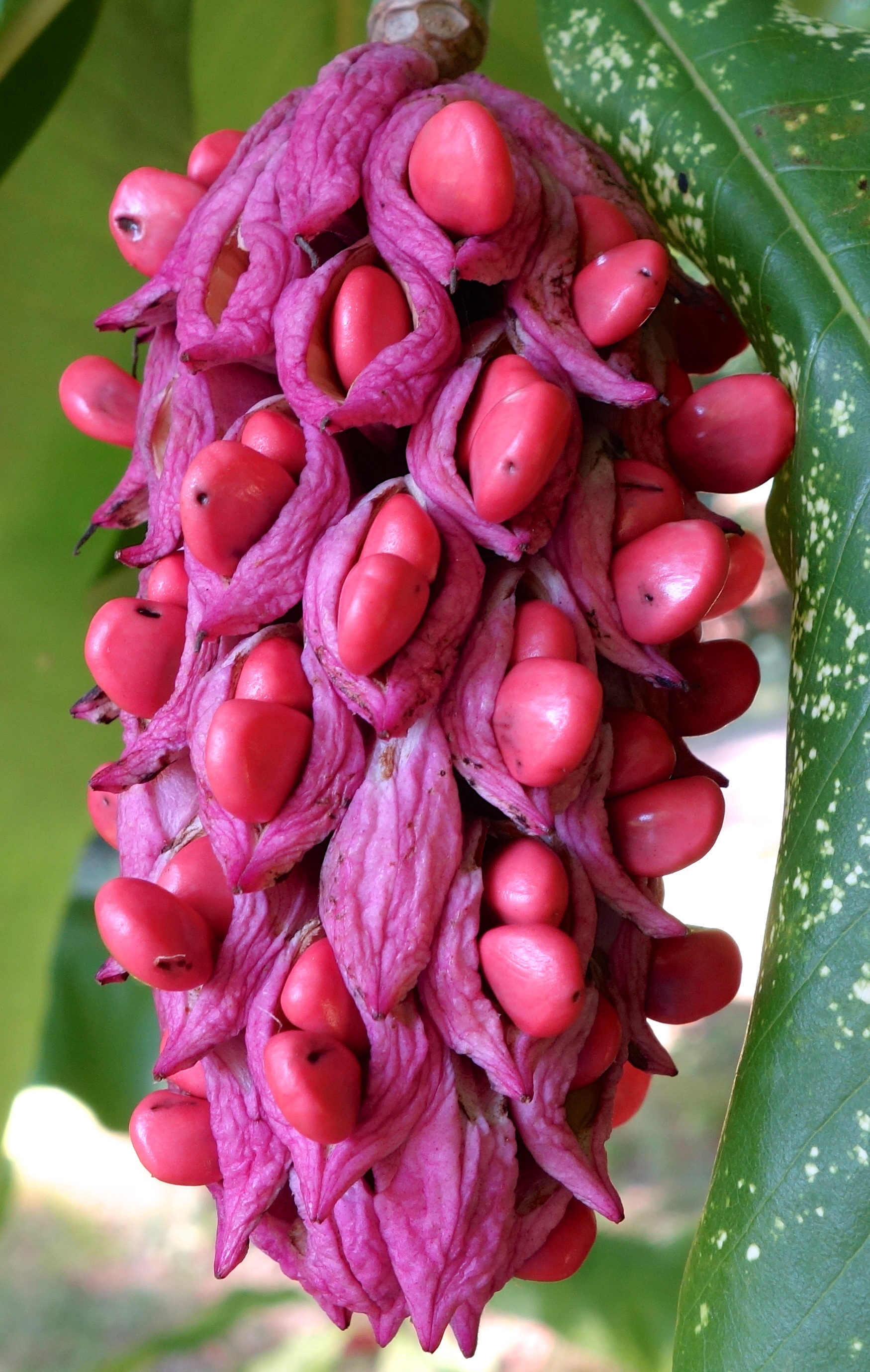
Mature fruit with seeds

== Diseases ==
Umbrella magnolias are victim to pests such as magnolia scales or yellow poplar weevils. Magnolia scales infest and slowly kill branches of many trees, including species of magnolias. Yellow poplar weevils infest the leaves of magnolias and can cause mortality.

== Conservation ==
Magnolia tripetala has a secure conservation status across multiple states in most of its native range. However there are multiple states where the tree is considered critically imperiled or exotic. Many states within the native range of M. tripetala have not assessed its endangerment status. States where there is no status ranking (SNR/SU/SNA) for M. tripetala include Missouri, Arkansas, Tennessee, Alabama, Georgia, South Carolina, Massachusetts, and Connecticut. States where the tree is considered secure (S5) include North Carolina, Virginia, West Virginia, and Kentucky. Magnolia tripetala is critically imperiled (S1) in Oklahoma, Mississippi, Florida, and Indiana. Global status for M. tripetala is secure (G5) as of 1991. Global status is in need of review. Efforts to conserve M. tripetala have been taken by local and state-wide ecological groups and are still being recommended. As the tree grows on steep slopes, the trees and soil are subject to damage due to human traffic in its native range. Ailanthus altissima has been described as a competitor to M. tripetala and has been removed from its habitat to better support M. tripetala persistence.

== Ecology ==
Magnolia tripetala most commonly lives in slope forests on north-facing slopes. The tree has been seen to grow along streambanks as well as in many ravines. Beetles are the primary pollinators of M. tripetala and birds and squirrels disperse seeds. Beetles enter buds of the flowers to feed on pollen and move this pollen from male parts of the flower to female parts. The male reproductive parts of the flower mature first. These trees are slow to spread but seedlings are resilient. Flowers bloom in the spring while seeds mature and spread throughout the summer.
