= Betta antoni =

Conservation status
- Endangered (IUCN 3.1)

Scientific classification
- Kingdom: Animalia
- Phylum: Chordata
- Class: Actinopterygii
- Order: Anabantiformes
- Family: Osphronemidae
- Genus: Betta
- Species: B. antoni

Binomial name
- Betta antoni H. H. Tan & P. K. L. Ng, 2006

Species of fish

Betta antoni is a species of gourami endemic to the Sanggau area in the Kapuas region. The species name antoni is named after Irwan Anton "in recognition of his generous help and gift of specimens". This species grows to a length of 8 centimetres (3.1 in) SL. According to Linke, they live in "densely vegetated, narrow watercourses with very soft, very acidic water".

== Diet ==
=== In nature ===
In nature, Betta antoni has been seen preying on insects that lie on the surface of the water such as Drosophila (fruit flies), and very small fish.

=== In the aquarium ===
In the aquarium it will normally accept dried foods once they are recognised as edible but like all fish does best when offered a varied diet. In this case regular meals of live or frozen foods such as Daphnia, Artemia or bloodworm will ensure the development of the best colours and condition.

== Sexual dimorphism ==
Males grow larger, develop more iredescent scales, a broader head-shape, and more extended fins than that of females.

== Reproduction and development ==
Betta antoni is a paternal mouthbrooder, which means that the father incubates the fry in his mouth. The breeding process in Betta antoni is typical of mouthbrooders, and of the B. akarensis cluster of closely related species. The female plays the more active role in initiating courtship and defending the area against intruders. After courting, eggs and milt are released during an 'embrace' typical of anabantoids in which the male wraps his body around the female. Several 'practice' embraces may be required before any eggs are released. Once spawning begins, eggs are laid in small "batches" and picked up in the mouth of the female before being spat out into the water for the male to catch. Once the male has all the eggs in his mouth the cycle is repeated until the female is spent of eggs, a process which can take some time. The incubation period is 10 – 21 days at which point the male will begin to release fully-formed, free-swimming fry. It has been seen that the male accidentally swallows or releases the fry prematurely when stressed. The fry are large enough to consume motile foods such as microworm and Artemia nauplii immediately.

== In the aquarium ==
Betta antoni is of mild importance to the aquarium trade.
