= Extreme environment =

Habitat considered hard to survive in

An extreme environment is a habitat that is considered very hard to survive in due to its considerably extreme conditions such as temperature, accessibility to different energy sources or under high pressure. For an area to be considered an extreme environment, it must contain certain conditions and aspects that are considered very hard for other life forms to survive. Pressure conditions may be extremely high or low; high or low content of oxygen or carbon dioxide in the atmosphere; high levels of radiation, acidity, or alkalinity; absence of water; water containing a high concentration of salt; the presence of sulphur, petroleum, and other toxic substances.

Examples of extreme environments include the geographical poles, very arid deserts, volcanoes, deep ocean trenches, upper atmosphere, outer space, and the environments of every planet in the Solar System except the Earth. Any organisms living in these conditions are often very well adapted to their living circumstances, which is usually a result of long-term evolution. Physiologists have long known that organisms living in extreme environments are especially likely to exhibit clear examples of evolutionary adaptation because of the presumably intense past natural selection they have experienced.

== On Earth ==
The distribution of extreme environments on Earth has varied through geological time. Humans generally do not inhabit extreme environments. There are organisms referred to as extremophiles that do live in such conditions and are so well-adapted that they readily grow and multiply. Extreme environments are usually hard to survive in.

== Beyond Earth ==
Most of the moons and planets in the Solar System are also extreme environments. Astrobiologists have not yet found life in any environments beyond Earth, though experiments have shown that tardigrades can survive the harsh vacuum and intense radiation of outer space. The conceptual modification of conditions in locations beyond Earth, to make them more habitable by humans and other terrestrial organisms, is known as terraforming.

== Types ==
Among extreme environments are places that are alkaline, acidic, or unusually hot or cold or salty, or without water or oxygen. There are also places altered by humans, such as mine tailings or oil impacted habitats.

- Alkaline: broadly conceived as natural habitats above pH 9 whether persistently, or with regular frequency or for protracted periods of time.
- Acidic: broadly conceived as natural habitats below pH 5 whether persistently, or with regular frequency or for protracted periods of time.
- Extremely cold: broadly conceived habitats periodically or consistently below -17 °C either persistently, or with regular frequency or for protracted periods of time. Includes montane sites, polar sites, and deep ocean habitats.
- Extremely hot: broadly conceived habitats periodically or consistently in excess of 40 °C either persistently, or with regular frequency or for protracted periods of time. Includes sites with geothermal influences such as Yellowstone and comparable locations worldwide or deep-sea vents.
- Hypersaline: environments with salt concentrations greater than that of seawater, that is, >3.5%. Includes salt lakes.
- Under pressure: broadly conceived as habitats under extreme hydrostatic pressure – i.e. aquatic habitats deeper than 2000 meters and enclosed habitats under pressure. Includes habitats in oceans and deep lakes.
- Radiation: broadly conceived as habitats exposed to abnormally high radiation or of radiation outside the normal range of light. Includes habitats exposed to high UV and IR radiation.
- Without water: broadly conceived as habitats without free water whether persistently, or with regular frequency or for protracted periods of time. Includes hot and cold desert environments, and some endolithic habitats
- Without oxygen: broadly conceived as habitats without free oxygen – whether persistently, or with regular frequency, or for protracted periods of time. Includes habitats in deeper sediments.
- Altered by humans: i.e. anthropogenically impacted habitats. Includes mine tailings, oil impacted habitats, and pollution by heavy metals or organic compounds.
- Without light: deep ocean environments and habitats such as caves.
- Void of food: areas on earth that lack an abundance of food such as the vast ocean, desert and high country.
- Extreme pressure: deep ocean areas

== Extreme habitats ==
Many different habitats can be considered extreme environments, such as the polar ice caps, the driest spots in deserts, and abyssal depths in the ocean. Many different places on the Earth demand that species become highly specialized if they are to survive. In particular, microscopic organisms that can't be seen with the naked eye often thrive in surprising places.

=== Polar regions ===
Owing to the dangerously low temperatures, the number of species that can survive in these remote areas is very slim. Over years of evolution and adaptation to this extremely cold environment, both microscopic and larger species have survived and thrived no matter what conditions they have faced. By changing their eating patterns and due to their dense pelt or their body fat, only a few species have been capable of adapting to such harsh conditions and have learned how to thrive in these cold environments.

=== Deserts ===
A desert is known for its extreme temperatures and extremely dry climate. The type of species that live in this area have adapted to these harsh conditions over years and years. Species that are able to store water and have learned how to protect themselves from the Sun's harsh rays are the only ones that are capable of surviving in these extreme environments.

=== Oceans ===
The ocean's depths and temperatures contain some of the most extreme conditions for any species to survive. The deeper one travels, the higher the pressure and the lower the visibility gets, causing completely blacked out conditions. Many of these conditions are too intense for humans to travel to, so instead of sending humans down to these depths to collect research, scientists are using smaller submarines or deep sea drones to study these creatures and extreme environments.

== Types of species in extreme environments ==
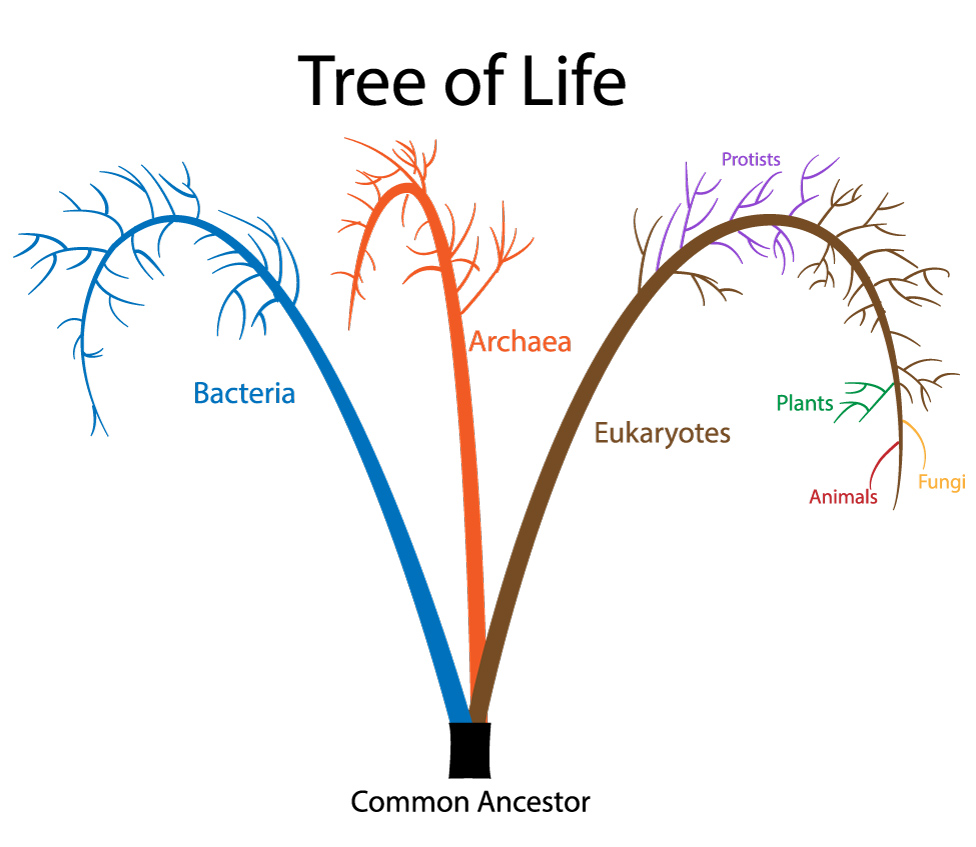
The origin of each species

There are many different species that are either commonly known or not known amongst many people. These species have either adapted over time into these extreme environments or they have resided their entire life no matter how many generations. The different species are able to live in these environments because of their flexibility with adaptation. Many can adapt to different climate conditions and hibernate, if need be, to survive.

The following list contains only a few species that live in extreme environments.

Examples

- Giant kangaroo rat
- Certain species of frogs
- Thermotolerant worms (Alvinella pompejana)
- Devil worms, Halicephalobus mephisto
- Greenland shark
- Marine microorganism
- Bdelloidea
- Tardigrade (waterbear)
- Himalayan jumping spider, Euophrys omnisuperstes
- Cockroach

== Extreme environment examples ==
- Antarctica
- Dead Sea
- Mammoth Hot Springs
- Mariana Trench
- Mono Lake
- Mount Everest
- Sahara

== Picture gallery ==
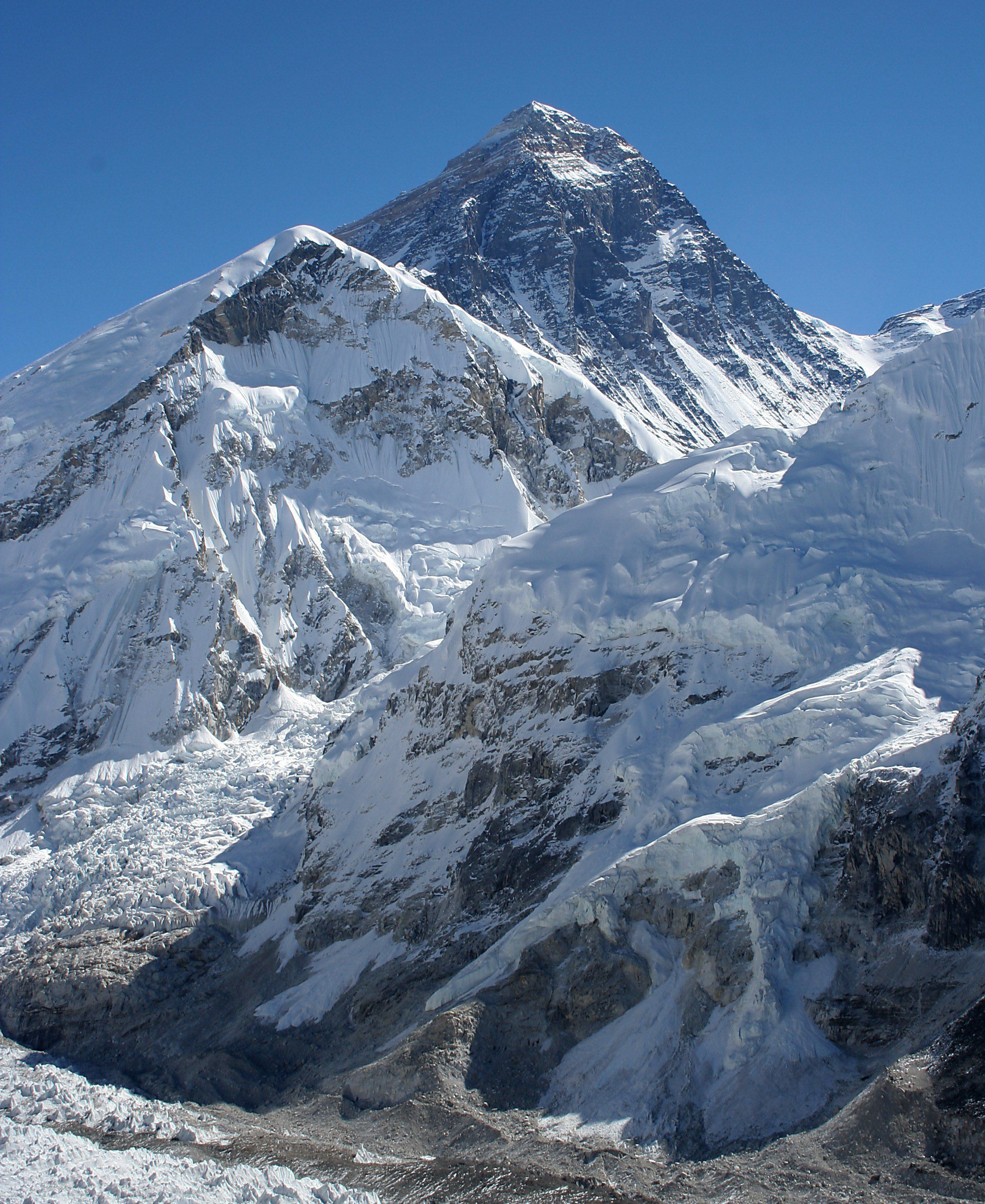
Mount Everest

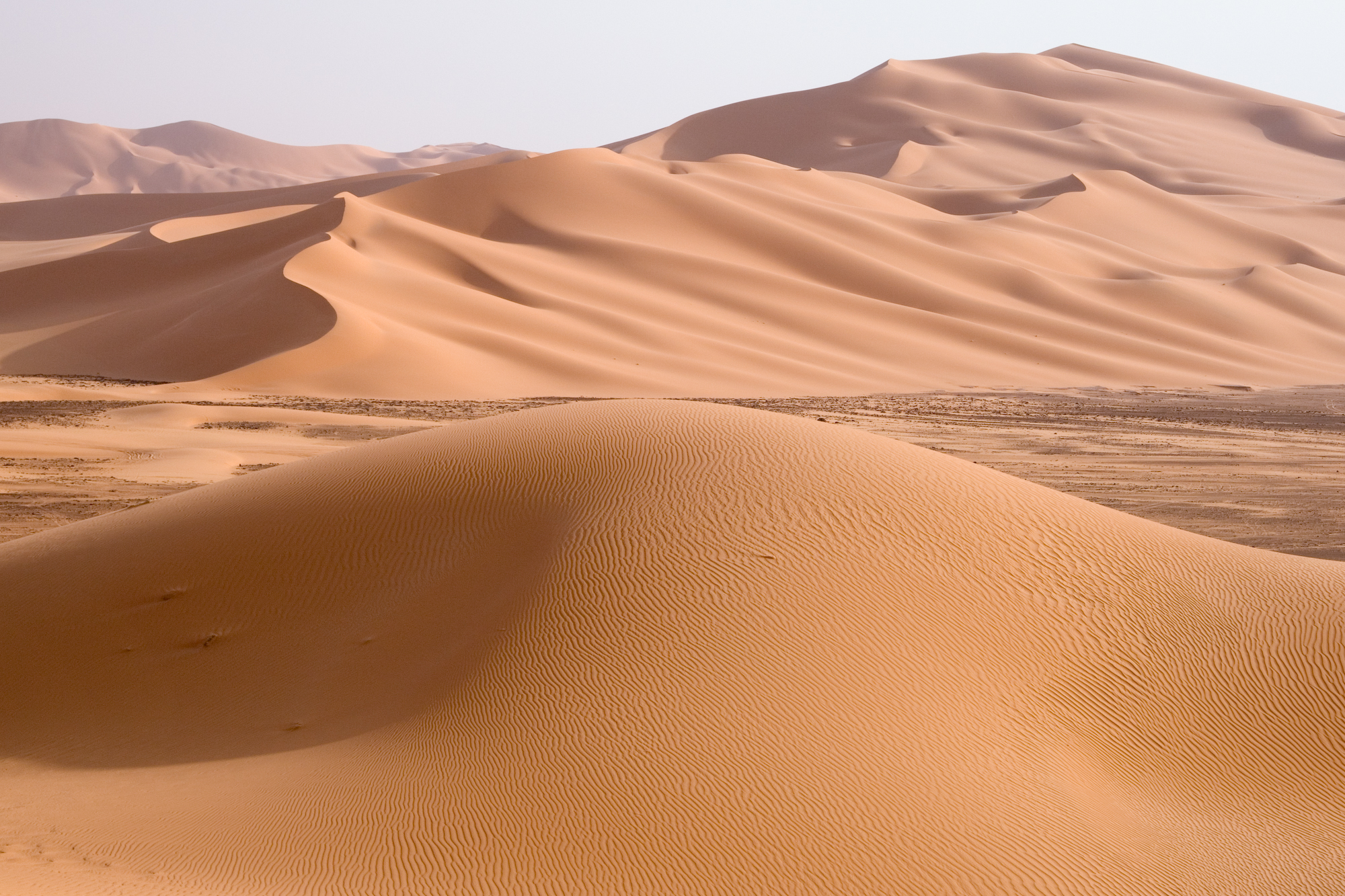
Desert

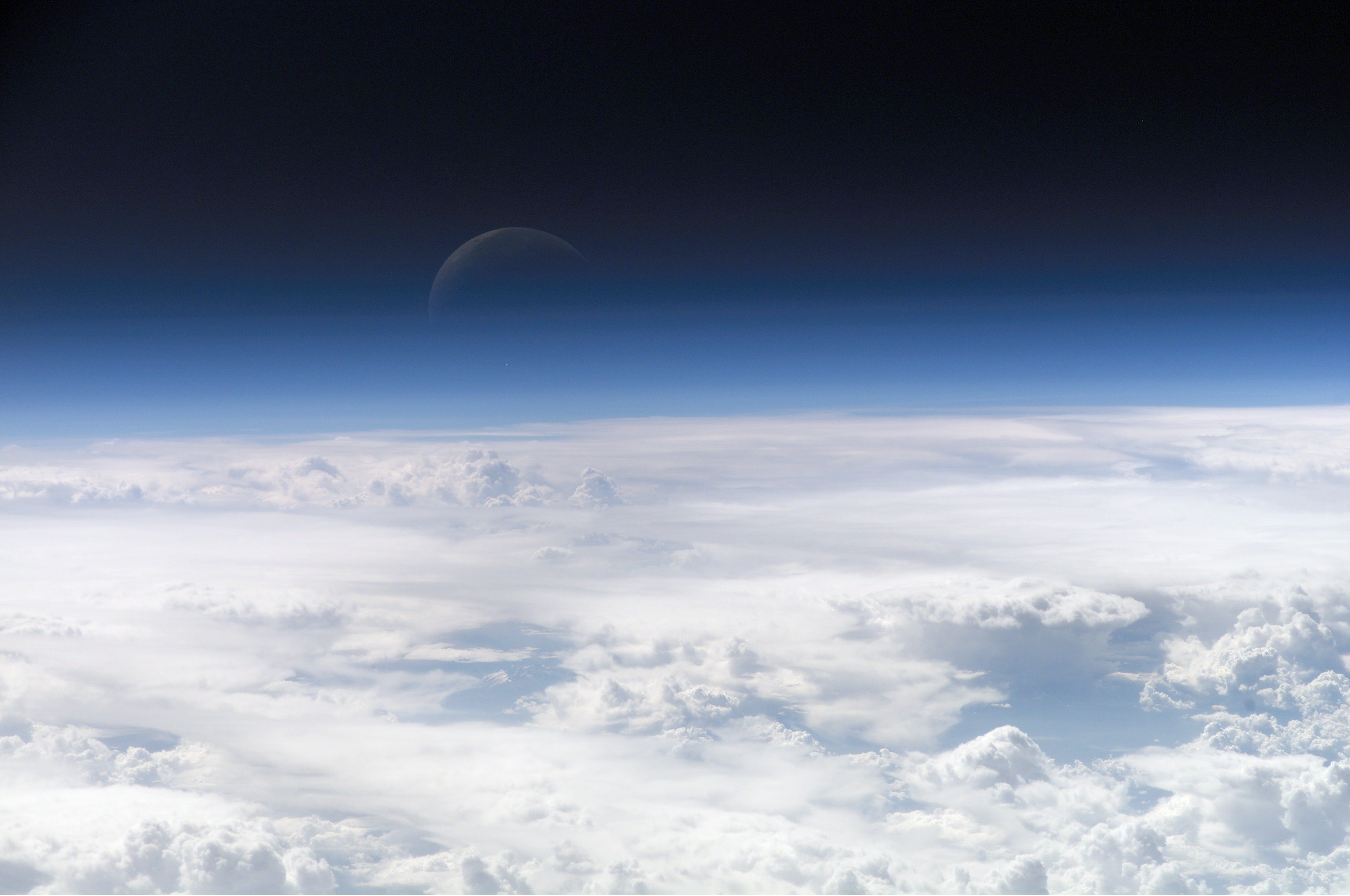
Atmosphere and Universe

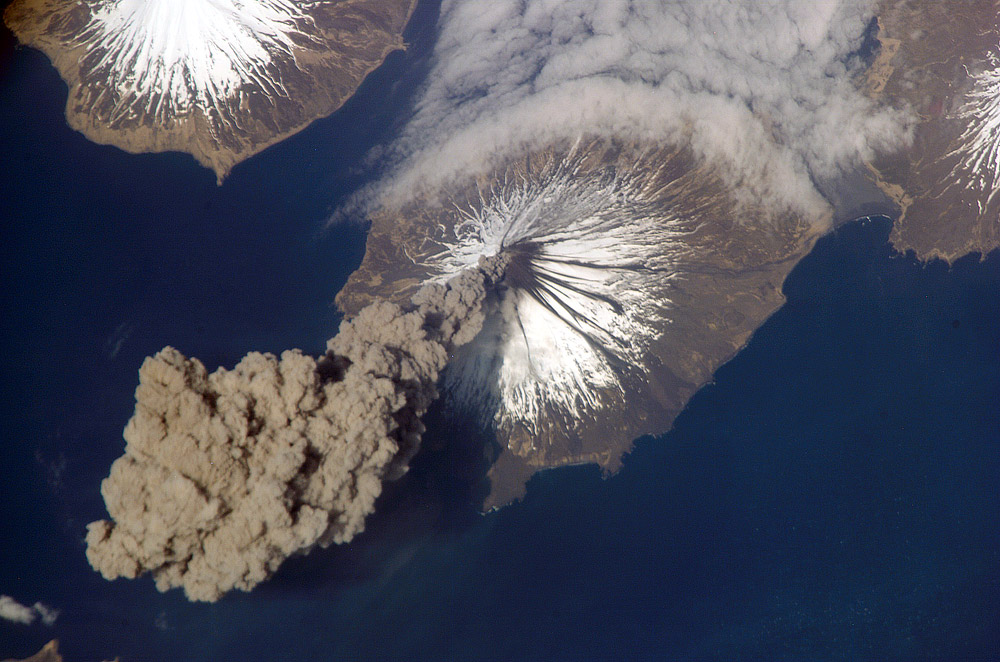
Volcano

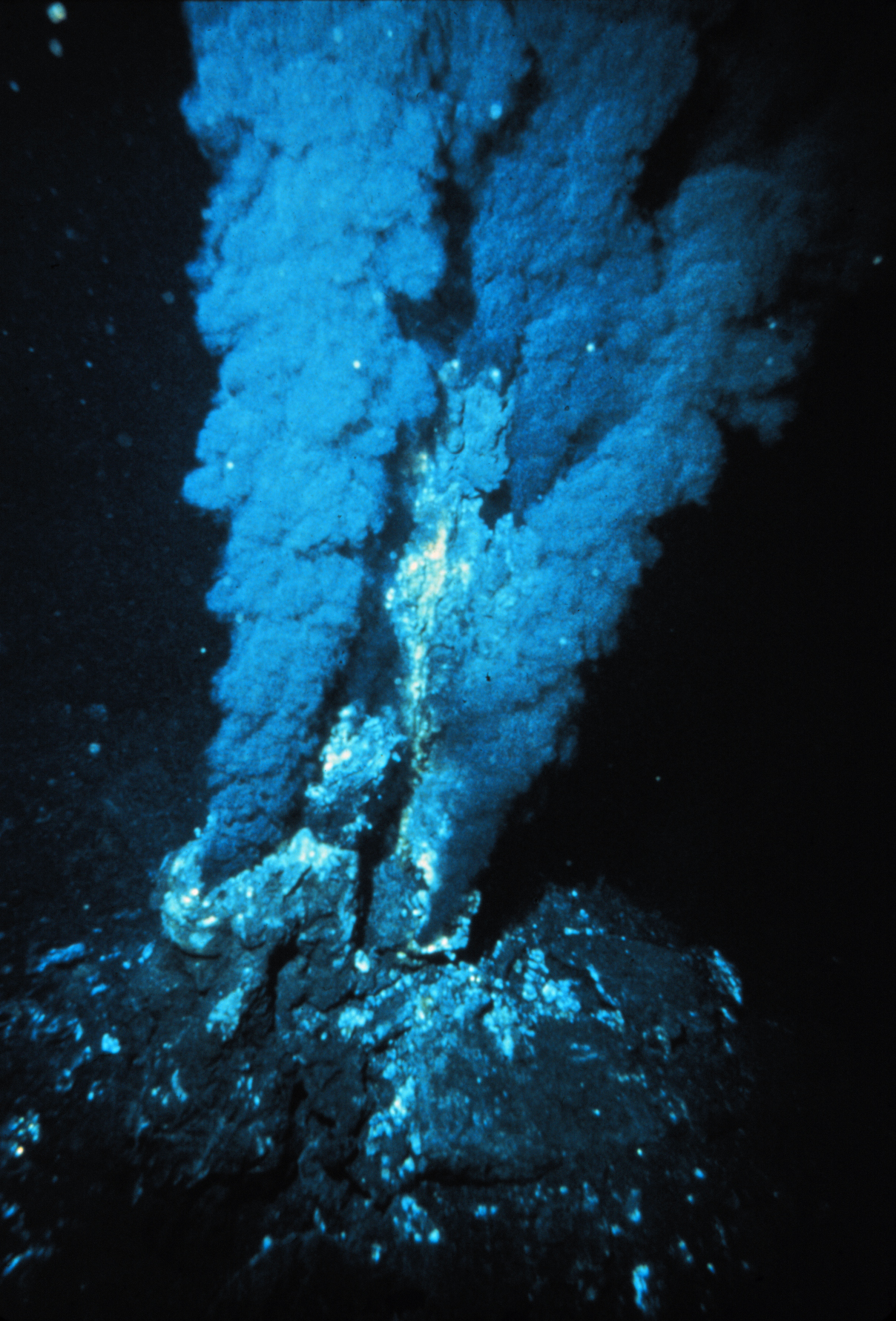
Hydrothermal vent

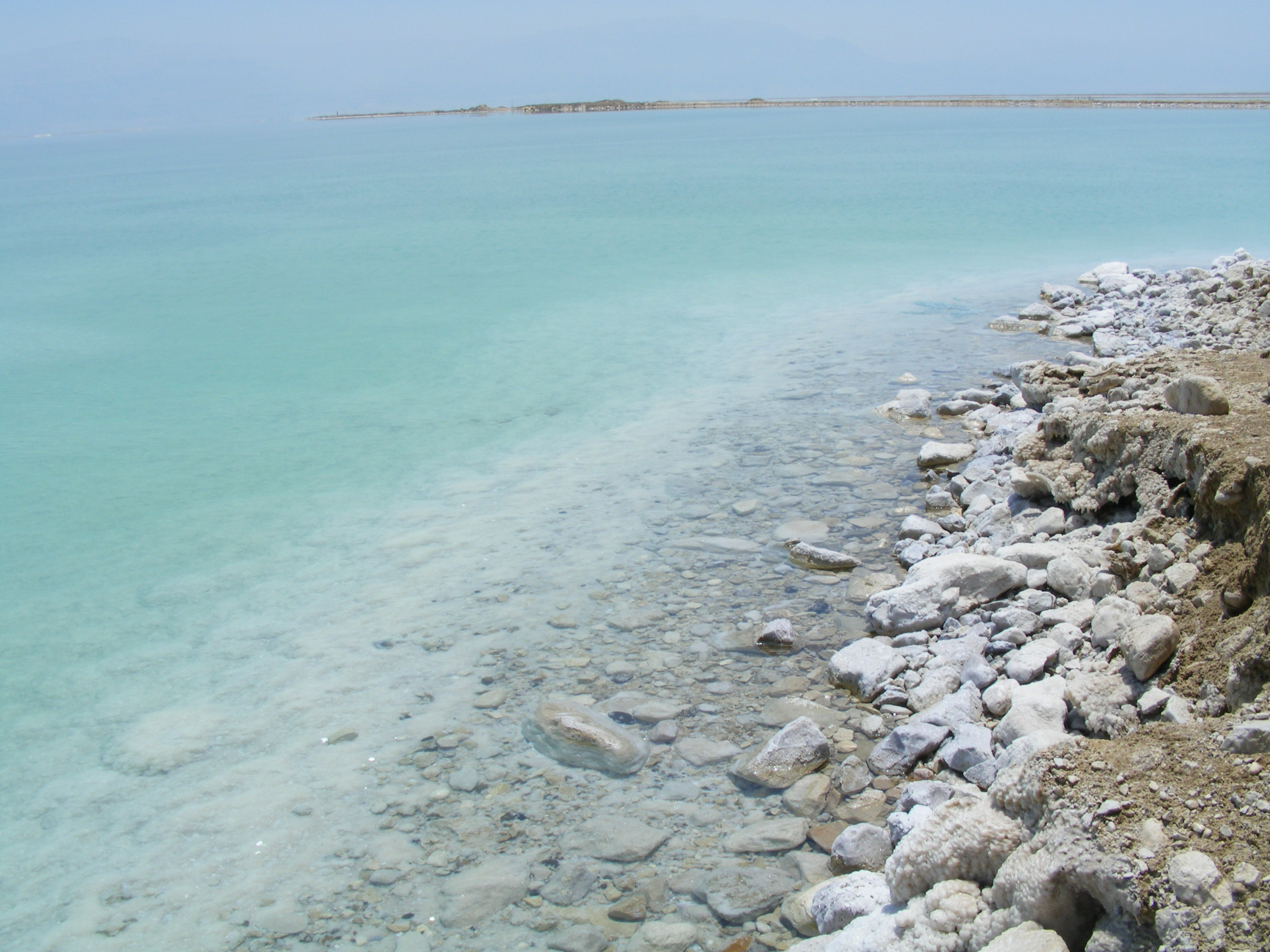
High salinity of the Dead Sea

== See also ==
- Adaptation
- Ecology
- Ecophysiology
- Evolutionary physiology
- Extreme environment clothing
- Extremophile
- Habitat
- LExEN (Life in Extreme Environments)
- Natural environment
- Species
