= Anguillula =

Anguillula may refer to:

- Anguillula (nematode) Ehrenberg, 1831, a genus of nematodes in the family Tripylidae
- Anguillula Mueller, 1786, a genus of nematodes in the family Panagrolaimidae, synonym of Panagrellus
- Anguillula, a genus of Chromista, synonym of Lankesterella
