= Panagrolaimus superbus =

Scientific classification
- Kingdom: Animalia
- Phylum: Nematoda
- Class: Chromadorea
- Order: Rhabditida
- Family: Panagrolaimidae
- Genus: Panagrolaimus
- Species: P. superbus

Binomial name
- Panagrolaimus superbus Fuchs, 1930

Species of roundworm

Panagrolaimus superbus is a species of terrestrial free-living nematode (roundworm). P. superbus, like other species within the Panagrolaimus genus, exhibits the ability to enter anhydrobiosis for extended periods of time.

== Ecology ==
P. superbus is a non-parasitic terrestrial bacterivore, commonly found on grasses such as rye. It is found in continental Europe, as well as Surtsey, Iceland.

== Metabolism ==
In order to combat rapid desiccation, P. superbus has several constitutive genes that allow the accumulation of trehalose, even under normal metabolic circumstances, that acts as a protective layer and an intracellular protection mechanism. P. superbus also has several inducible genes that upregulate in response to desiccation, genes responsible for enzymes such as gpx, dj1 and 1 Cys-Prx to help scavenge and reduce reactive oxygen species, mitogen-activated protein kinases that phosphorylate heat shock proteins such as Hsp27 to stabilise microfilaments, and casein kinase 2 that helps in DNA repair, among others. P. superbus's ability to enter anhydriobiosis has given it polyextremotolerance, a tolerance of various extreme environments, being the first multi-cellular organism able to withstand immersion and reproduce in heavy water, albeit with a reduced metabolic rate, withstand immersion in gallium, and tolerate g-forces up to 400,000 times the Earth's.
