= Panagrolaimus detritophagus =

Scientific classification
- Domain: Eukaryota
- Kingdom: Animalia
- Phylum: Nematoda
- Class: Secernentea
- Order: Tylenchida
- Family: Panagrolaimidae
- Genus: Panagrolaimus
- Species: P. detritophagus

Binomial name
- Panagrolaimus detritophagus Fuchs, 1930

Species of roundworm

Panagrolaimus detritophagus is a terrestrial free-living nematode (roundworm). It has been reported in California, South America and Europe. It is the type species of the genus Panagrolaimus. In 2018, it, along with another nematode species (Plectus parvus) became the first multicellular organism to be thawed back into a living state after prolonged cryopreservation. Pleistocene permafrost was obtained from the Kolyma River lowland, and thawed. The worms moved and ate after being thawed. They had been frozen for 30–40 thousand years, based on the age of that deposit.

== Ecology ==
This species is non-parasitic. It decomposes soil organic matter with the aid of symbiotic bacteria. As such it is a decomposer. It is also involved in nitrogen mineralization. This species is considered an enrichment opportunist. That means that this is a cp-1 ("colonizer") nematode, like many Panagrolaimidae species. Enrichment opportunists are loosely comparable to r-strategists. They multiply quickly after an organic enrichment event, and then their population rapidly declines when nutrients run out. Organic enrichment is the rapid addition of a large amount of organic nutrients, for example due to a pollution event.

== Anatomy ==
Adult females have been measured to be approximately 740 micrometers long and 33.5 micrometers wide, with a mass of approximately half a microgram. Males and females have been collected. All specimens have a short, cylinder-shaped stoma and a valve in the postcorpus. This species lacks caudal alae. Males have spicules. Females have a single ovary which is reflexed and prodelphic. The spermatheca is offset. This species is described as very active and fast-moving.
