= Halicephalobus mephisto =

Scientific classification
- Kingdom: Animalia
- Phylum: Nematoda
- Class: Chromadorea
- Order: Rhabditida
- Family: Panagrolaimidae
- Genus: Halicephalobus
- Species: H. mephisto

Binomial name
- Halicephalobus mephisto (Borgonie, García-Moyano, Litthauer, Bert, Bester, van Heerden, Möller, Erasmus, & Onstott, 2011)

Species of roundworm

Halicephalobus mephisto is a species of nematode, among a number of other roundworms, discovered by geoscientists Gaetan Borgonie and Tullis Onstott in 2011. It was detected in ore recovered from deep rock fracture water in several gold mines in South Africa 0.9 km (0.56 mi), 1.3 km (0.81 mi), and 3.6 km (2.2 mi) under the surface of the Earth. Onstott said that "it scared the life out of me when I first saw them moving", and explained that "they look like black little swirly things". The finding is significant because no other multicellular organism had ever been detected farther than 2 km (1.2 mi) below the Earth's surface. It is named after Mephistopheles, the Lord of the Underworld in the Faust story, and alludes to the fact it is found so deep under the Earth's surface.

Research has shown that Halicephalobus mephisto possesses special heat-shock and stress-response genes that allow it to survive over 3 kilometers below Earth's surface, in high temperatures and low oxygen conditions.

Halicephalobus mephisto is resistant to a temperature as high as 37 °C (higher than most terrestrial nematodes can tolerate), it reproduces asexually, and feeds on subterranean bacteria. According to radiocarbon dating, these worms live in groundwater that is 3,000–12,000 years old. The worms are also able to survive in waters with extremely low levels of oxygen, lower than one percent of the level of most oceans. This nematode is able to thrive in such extreme conditions due to its adaptations to the environment including changed cellular respiration pathways to facilitate survival in low levels of oxygen, an expansion in their stress-response gene families such as Hsp70 to aid in the protections against thermal damage, and its modified cytochrome c oxidase enzyme that helps stabilize respiration and elevated temperatures.

It is the deepest-living animal ever found, able to withstand heat and crushing pressure, and the first multicellular organism found at deep subsurface levels. A previously known species found at similar depths in the same study was Plectus aquatilis. Borgonie said that the worm was similar to the detritus-feeding species found on the surface, and probably descended from surface species. Such species are also able to survive extremes of temperature, and so, for Borgonie, the fact the first animal discovered at this depth was a worm was unsurprising. The team hypothesised that the species was descended from animals on the surface that were washed down the Earth's crust by rainwater.

Halicephalobus mephisto worms measure from 0.5 to 0.56 mm (0.020 to 0.022 in) in length. Though species in the genus Halicephalobus have few distinguishing features, H. mephisto can be differentiated from other species within its genus by its comparatively long tail, which is between 110 and 130 micrometres in length. It is somewhat closely related to the mammalian pathogen Halicephalobus gingivalis, but is more closely related to certain unnamed species of the genus.

In 2019, genome sequencing of the nematode indicated that there were expansions of the 70 kilodalton heat shock protein (Hsp70) and avrRpt2 -induced gene 1 (AIG1) proteins, both of which are transcriptionally induced under heat stress. De novo Illumina assembly with PacBio reads produced a 61.4 Mb assembly made of 880 scaffold and 313 kb N50.

The water Halicephalobus mephisto was found in contained aerobic and anaerobic bacteria. Unlike other nematodes, it does not prefer Escherichia coli, and would rather feed on the sulphophile endolith and depth specialist Desulforudis audaxviator. The found specimen of H. mephisto propagated through parthenogenesis.
