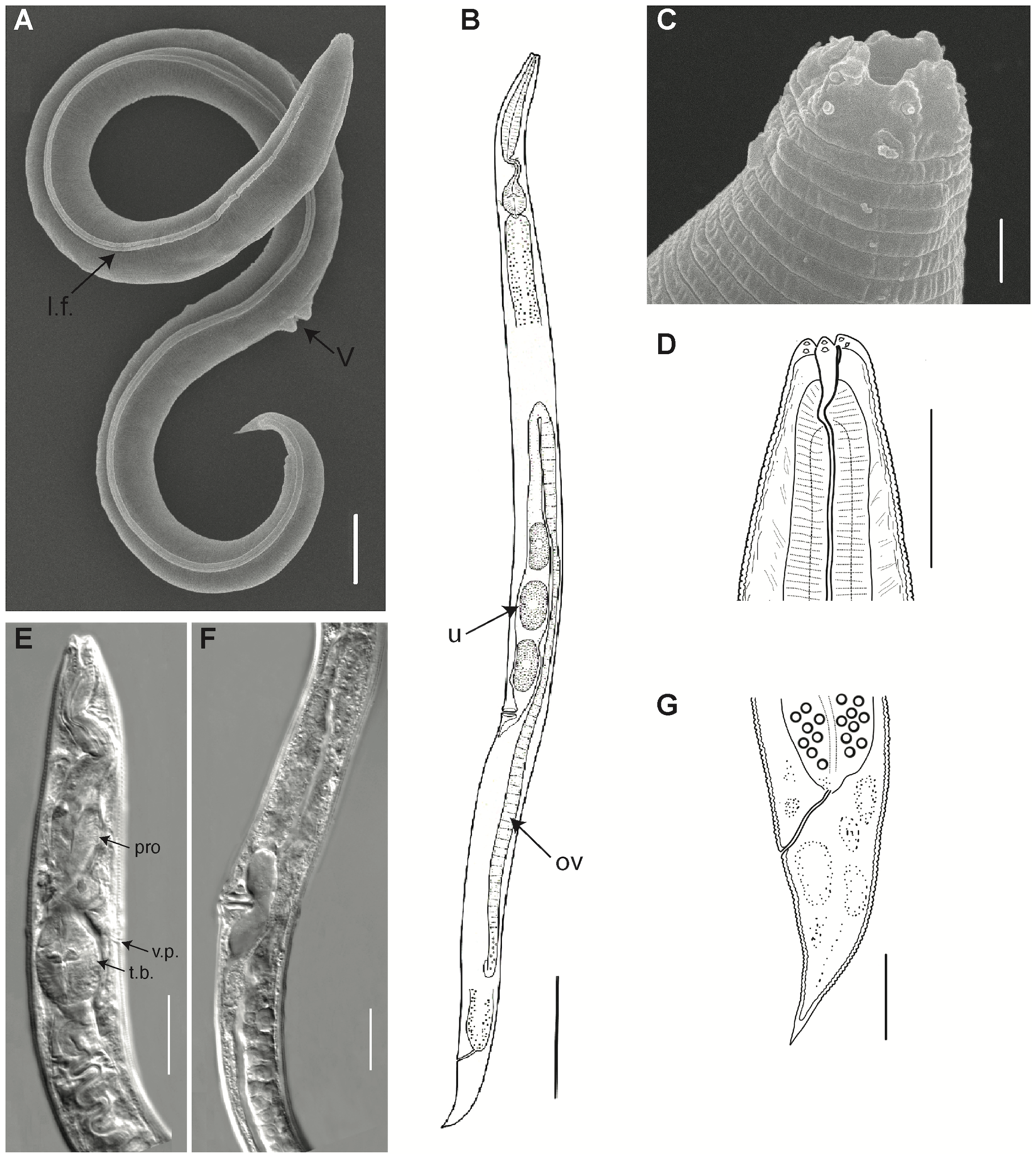

Scientific classification
- Kingdom: Animalia
- Phylum: Nematoda
- Class: Secernentea
- Order: Tylenchida
- Family: Panagrolaimidae
- Genus: Panagrolaimus
- Species: P. kolymaensis

Binomial name
- Panagrolaimus kolymaensis Shatilovich, Gade, Pippel, Hoffmeyer, Tchesunov, Stevens, Winkler, Hughes, Traikov, Hiller, Rivkina, Schiffer, Myers & Kurzchalia, 2023

= Panagrolaimus kolymaensis =

Panagrolaimus kolymaensis Temporal range: 0.046–0 Ma

Species of nematode

Panagrolaimus kolymaensis is a species of nematode.

The species was named after the Kolyma River in Russia, where the first two specimens were discovered.

In 2023, it was reported that nematodes of the previously undescribed Panagrolaimus kolymaensis were revived after 46,000 years in cryptobiosis. However, a number of scientists expressed skepticism regarding the accuracy of the age analysis for these worms. Phylogenetic analysis and genome comparison with C. elegans revealed that the species shared mechanisms for cryptobiotic survival.

== See also ==
- List of longest-living organisms#Revived into activity after stasis
- List of resurrected species
