= Halicephalobus =

Scientific classification
- Domain: Eukaryota
- Kingdom: Animalia
- Phylum: Nematoda
- Class: Secernentea
- Order: Tylenchida
- Family: Panagrolaimidae
- Genus: Halicephalobus; Timm, 1956

Genus of roundworms

Halicephalobus is a genus of nematodes belonging to the family Panagrolaimidae.

The genus has almost cosmopolitan distribution.

Species:

- Halicephalobus gingivalis (Stefanski, 1954)
- Halicephalobus intermedius (Pokrovskaya, 1964)
- Halicephalobus laticauda Geraert et al., 1988
- Halicephalobus limuli Timm, 1956
- Halicephalobus persicus Shokoohi, Abolafia & Zad, 2007
- Halicephalobus mephisto Borgonie, García-Moyano, Litthauer, Bert, Bester, van Heerden, Möller, Erasmus, & Onstott, 2011
