= Hargraves (crater) =

Crater on Mars

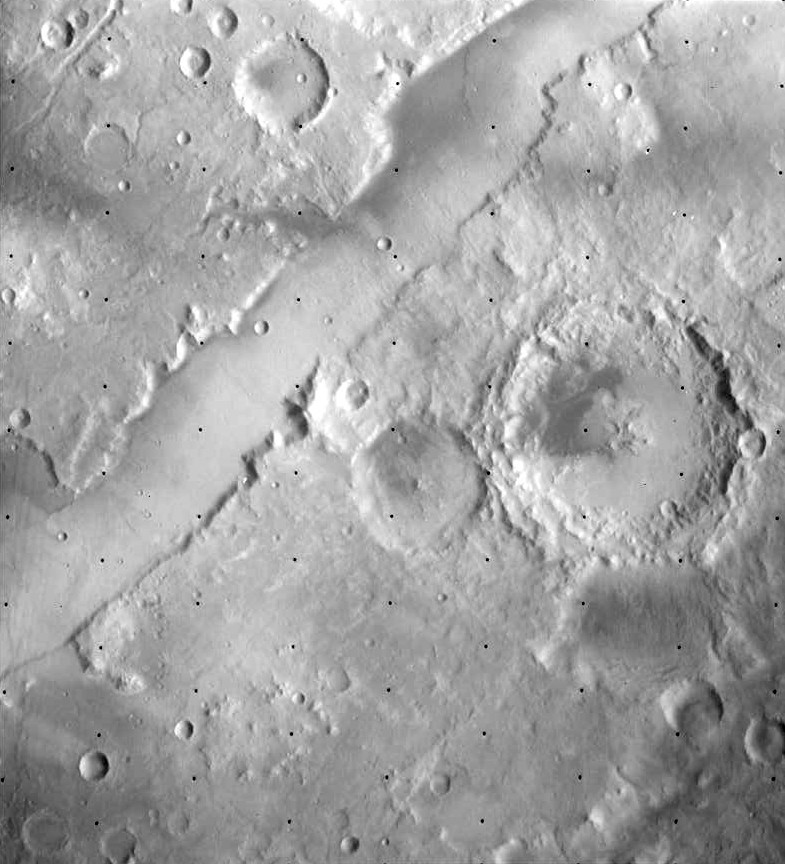
- Viking Orbiter 1 image with Hargraves as the largest crater at center-right
- Planet: Mars
- Region: Syrtis Major quadrangle Nili Fossae; Greater Isidis region
- Coordinates: 20.74°N 75.74°E
- Quadrangle: Syrtis Major
- Diameter: 60.28 km 69 km

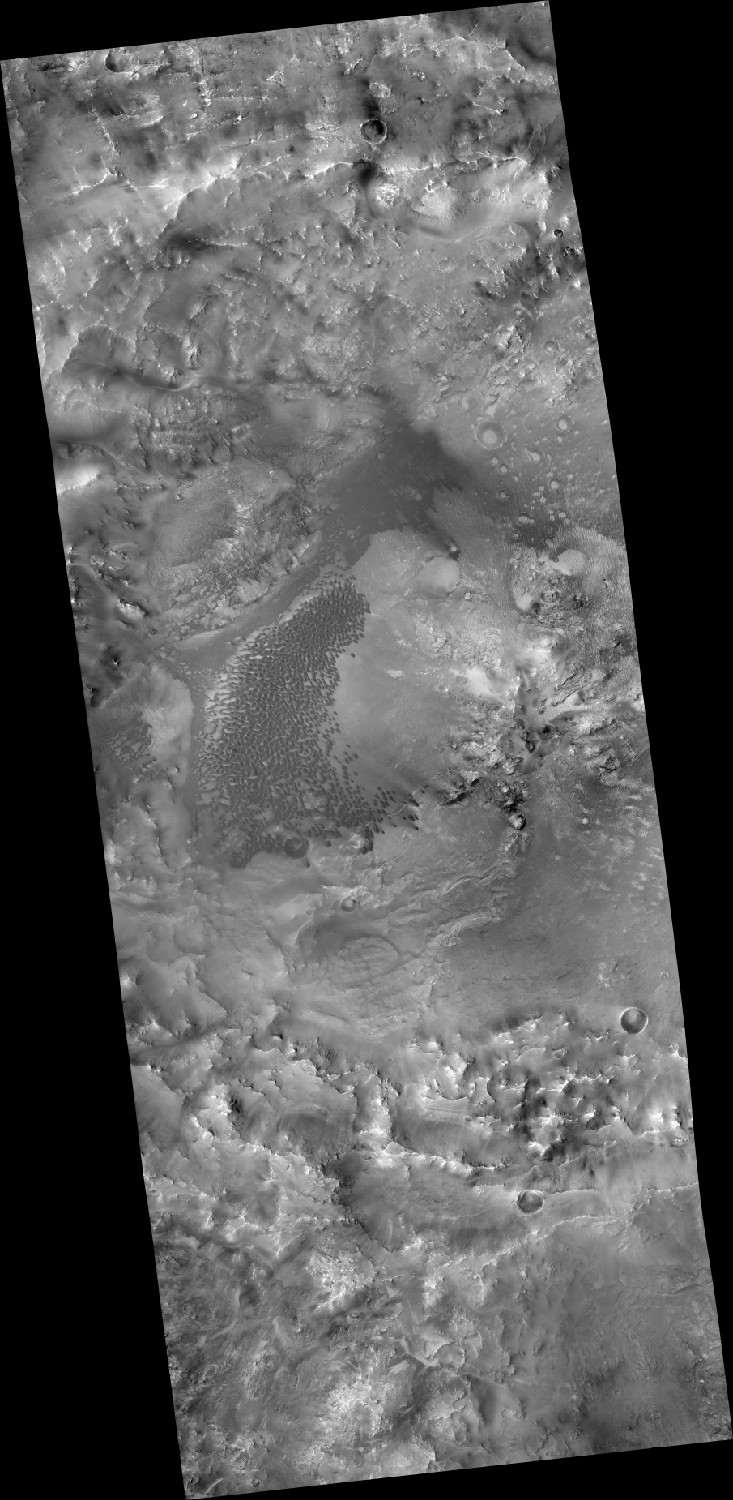
Central Hargraves crater from MRO CTX camera, showing the dune field on the west side of the crater, and the central peak complex at right

Hargraves is a Hesperian-age complex double-layered ejecta impact crater on Mars. It was emplaced near the crustal dichotomy in the vicinity of the Nili Fossae, the Syrtis Major volcanic plains, and the Isidis impact basin, and is situated within the Syrtis Major quadrangle. Hargraves has been the target of focused study because its ejecta apron is particularly well-preserved for a Martian crater of its size. It has been analogized to similar double-layered ejecta blankets on Earth, including that of the Ries impact structure, which was where the conceptual model for how such craters formed was first advanced.

The presence of Hargraves ejecta in a trough of the Nili Fossae to its west, contributed to a consideration of the Nili Fossae as a possible candidate landing site for NASA's Perseverance rover. The presence of certain minerals (phyllosilicates, serpentine, and magnesite) detected remotely in Hargraves ejecta imply aqueous alteration either at the time of the Hargraves impact or by virtue of a hydrothermal system active after impact.

== Context ==
Hargraves lies near the crustal dichotomy of Mars in the vicinity of the Syrtis Major volcanic province. It is located between the two largest fossae (graben) of the Nili Fossae, which are troughs to the northeast of Isidis Planitia that are concentric to the impact site that likely excavated it. The crater lies over 100 km to the northwest of Jezero Crater, the landing site of NASA's Perseverance rover, which arrived on Mars in February 2021.

During the landing site selection process for Perseverance, a site in the Nili Fossae graben due west of Hargraves Crater was evaluated as a finalist in part because of the likelihood that blocks exhumed from depth by Hargraves were thought to be present in the vicinity of the landing ellipse. Clay-bearing materials, carbonate minerals (magnesite), and serpentine were also associated with the Hargraves ejecta apron, implying either syn- or post-impact non-acidic aqueous alteration, the latter case possibly involving hydrothermal activity. Early assessments of regions of interest scrutinized Hargraves Crater itself as a possibly valuable science target in the Nili Fossae region. Final downselection of the rover landing sites eventually favored nearby Jezero crater over the Nili Fossae candidate.

Hargraves Crater is named after the South African and American geoscientist Robert B. Hargraves, by the IAU in 2006, following his death in 2003. Hargraves studied impact structures on Earth and lunar samples returned by the Apollo program. He was also a participant in the Viking program to Mars.

== Geology ==
Hargraves Crater impacted after the emplacement of volcanic lavas from Syrtis Major Planum in this region. It largely overlies Noachian-age terrains incised by the Nili Fossae, including the Nili Fossae megabreccia unit associated with the megaimpact event that formed Isidis Planitia. The impact occurred in Hesperian time.

The ejecta deposits of Hargraves were emplaced in at least two stages. This is consistent with models for layered ejecta morphologies previously identified at the Ries impact structure in Bavaria, Germany, and the Mistastin impact structure in Labrador, Canada. The older ejecta unit (termed He1 by Sacks and co-authors) is a lighter-toned unit composed of two facies that can be morphologically distinguished based on differentially hummocky textures; coherent megablocks abound within the unit. The unit has been interpreted as a lithic impact breccia formed during a period of ballistic sedimentation. Although Hargraves impacted into Isidis-related megabreccias, this impact breccia unit can be distinguished spectrally from local megabreccia outcrops, and likely sampled strata in addition to the aforementioned megabreccia unit.

The younger, overlying ejecta unit (termed He2 by Sacks and co-authors) has been interpreted as a melt-bearing impactite akin to the suevite layer at the Ries structure. Outcrops of the lower ejecta unit are sometimes exposed as fensters through this overlying stratum. Just like at Ries, the two ejecta layers are separated by a sharp geologic contact. The identification of cooling cracks and pitted depressions also observed at other melt-bearing impact ejecta layers at other localities further supports this interpretation.

Hargraves exhibits evidence of modification by aeolian processes over time. Transverse aeolian ridges predominate in a NNW-SSE orientation atop the older ejecta unit (interpreted as a lithic impact breccia), implying the presence of a longstanding prevailing wind. A large erg is also present within the crater's topographic basin. Several channel forms indicative of fluvial activity also are observed in the eastern reaches of Hargraves' ejecta blanket, though due to aeolian infilling it is unclear if these channels predated or postdated the Hargraves impact itself. However, channel forms are also present within the Hargraves basin, suggesting that some fluvial activity must have postdated the impact. Hargraves has been noted as a possible heat source for melted subsurface ice in this region, which may have fed the fluvial activity linked to the filling of the Jezero impact structure. However, direct geomorphological evidence for subsurface ice associated with such a hypothesis has not been identified.

== Observational history ==
In 2016, Catheryn Ryan, Randolph Corney, Andrew MacRae (Saint Mary's University in Halifax), Livio Tornabene, Gordon Osinski, Haley Sapers (University of Western Ontario), John F. Mustard, and Kevin Cannon (Brown University) presented an abstract to the Lunar and Planetary Science Conference including a geomorphological map of Hargraves Crater's ejecta apron in the vicinity of the landing ellipse proposed for the Perseverance rover in the Nili Fossae region. They identified 22 subunits constituting the Hargraves ejecta blanket and polygonally fractured terrains. Other studies have highlighted the connection of Hargraves to the eventual final landing site of Perseverance at Jezero, or to the Nili Fossae candidate landing site to the west of the impact structure, in light both of its ejecta deposits and possibly interlinked fluvial activity between the two impact structures.

In 2019, Al Emran, Luke Marzen, and David King (Auburn University) presented an abstract to the Lunar and Planetary Science Conference reporting the results of an object-based image analysis of an erg within the Hargraves impact structure. The authors reported an overall classification accuracy of 91%.

In 2021, Leah Sacks, Livio Tornabene, Gordon Osinski, and Racel Sapoco (University of Western Ontario) published a detailed geologic map of Hargraves Crater. They identified Hargraves as a double-layered ejecta (DLE) crater akin to several terrestrial analogues, including the Ries impact structure in Germany, for which the initial conceptual model of such craters was articulated. The crater was of interest to the researchers because its ejecta blanket was relatively well-preserved, but it had experienced enough erosion to expose stratigraphy beneath the uppermost ejecta layer.
