= Betta akarensis =

Akar betta

Conservation status
- Data Deficient (IUCN 3.1)

Scientific classification
- Kingdom: Animalia
- Phylum: Chordata
- Class: Actinopterygii
- Order: Anabantiformes
- Family: Osphronemidae
- Genus: Betta
- Species: B. akarensis

Binomial name
- Betta akarensis C. T. Regan, 1910

Synonyms
- Betta climacura Vierke, 1988

Species of fish

Betta akarensis, the Akar betta, is a species of gourami endemic to south-east Sarawak, and whose species name akar was so named after where it was originally found in the river Sungai Akar. This species is a mouthbrooder, and grows to a length of 10 centimetres (3.9 in) SL. According to Linke, they "live predominantly in mineral-poor, slightly acid water enriched with humic substances".

== Morphology and description ==
Betta akarensis is a fish that measures 14 cm (5.5 in). Dorsal spines (total): 1; Dorsal soft rays (total): 7–8; Anal spines: 1–2; Anal soft rays: 26–28; Vertebrae: 31–32.

== Habitat and distribution ==
Betta akarensis lives in swampy forests, peat bogs, and acidic water. They are usually found in a more stagnant section of the streams among the leaf litter and submerged vegetation that dominates the bank. They are mouthbrooders. It is an adaptable fish and has even been seen in roadside ditches and larger ponds. They are native to Borneo where it has been found in Brunei (Darussalam), and Malaysian Borneo (Sarawak).

== Diet ==
Betta akarensis preys on insects such as Drosophila spp. (fruit flies) that lie on the surface and has been seen taking very small fish as well.

== Reproduction and development ==
Betta akarensis is a paternal mouthbrooder. The female plays the more active role in initiating courtship and defending the area against intruders. After courting, eggs and milt are released during an 'embrace' typical of anabantoids in which the male wraps his body around the female. Several 'practice' embraces may be required before any eggs are released.Once spawning commences, eggs are laid in small batches and picked up in the mouth of the female before being spat out into the water for the male to catch. Once the male has all the eggs in his mouth the cycle is repeated until the female is spent of eggs, a process which can take some time. The incubation period is 10 – 21 days at which point the male will begin to release fully-formed, free-swimming fry. It has been seen that the male accidentally swallows or releases the fry prematurely when stressed. The fry are large enough to consume motile foods such as microworm and Artemia nauplii immediately.
