= Robert B. Hargraves =

American geologist and professor (1928–2003)

- Born: August 11, 1928; Durban, Natal, South Africa
- Died: March 21, 2003 (aged 74); Princeton, New Jersey, US
- Education: Natal University College; Princeton University
- Awards: NASA Medal for Exceptional Scientific Achievement (1977); Jubilee Medal of the Geological Society of South Africa (1987)
- Scientific career
- Fields: Geology
- Workplaces: University of the Witwatersrand; Princeton University
- Thesis: Petrology of the Allard lake anorthosite suite, and paleomagnetism of the ilmenite deposits (1959)
- Doctoral students: Tullis Onstott; Lisa Rossbacher

Robert B. Hargraves (August 11, 1928 – March 21, 2003) was an American geologist who worked as a professor at Princeton University.

== Career ==
Hargraves was born in Durban, South Africa. He started in his career as mining geologist in 1948, after receiving his BS from Natal University. In 1952, he emigrated to the United States, and after service in the United States Army he went to graduate school at Princeton. After completion of his Ph.D. in 1959, he first worked at University of the Witwatersrand and then at Princeton.

== Achievements ==
Hargraves was a specialists in rock magnetism and petrology. In his career he discovered many impact features on Earth by studying the effects of the impact event on the local rock strata. He was actively involved in the study of rocks from the Moon, returned to Earth by the Apollo missions. He also worked on the Viking program and Pathfinder mission to the planet Mars.

== Honors ==
A crater on Mars is named in his honor.
