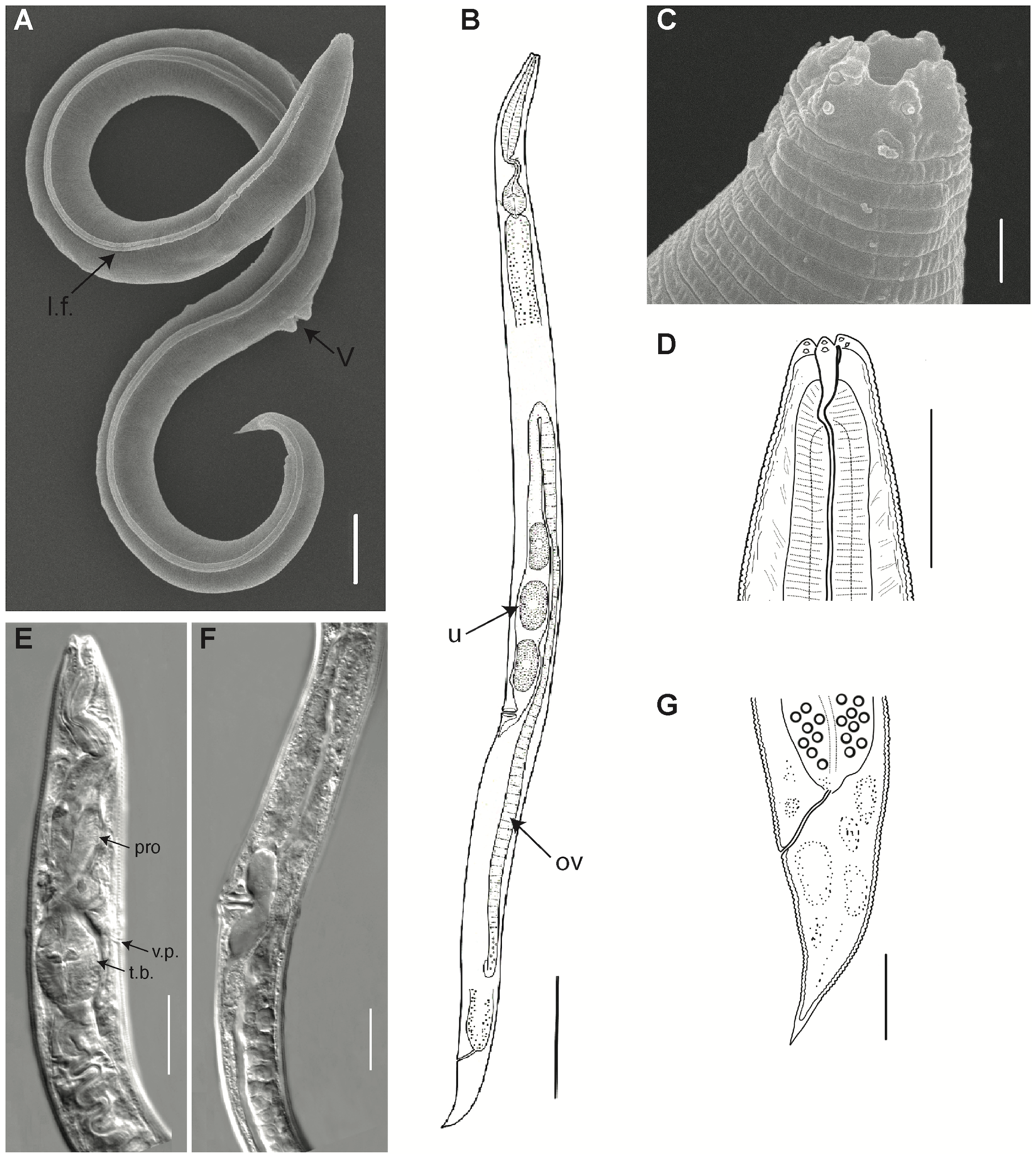
- Panagrolaimus kolymaensis

Scientific classification
- Kingdom: Animalia
- Phylum: Nematoda
- Class: Secernentea
- Order: Tylenchida
- Family: Panagrolaimidae
- Genus: Panagrolaimus; Fuchs, 1930

Synonyms
- Asymmetricus Kreis, 1930 Neocephalobus Steiner, 1929 Pseudorhabditis Perroncito, 1880

= Panagrolaimus =

Genus of nematodes

Panagrolaimus is a genus of nematodes in the family Panagrolaimidae. Scientists have revived specimens from this genus that are over 46,000 years old. It contains the following species:

- Panagrolaimus aberrans
- Panagrolaimus aestivus
- Panagrolaimus apicatus
- Panagrolaimus aquaticus
- Panagrolaimus australis
- Panagrolaimus burdwanensis
- Panagrolaimus chalcographi
- Panagrolaimus chararasi
- Panagrolaimus davidi
- Panagrolaimus dendroctoni
- Panagrolaimus dentritophagus
- Panagrolaimus detritophagus
- Panagrolaimus facetus
- Panagrolaimus fuchsi
- Panagrolaimus goodeyi
- Panagrolaimus hermineae
- Panagrolaimus hydrophilus
- Panagrolaimus hygrophilus
- Panagrolaimus kolymaensis
- Panagrolaimus leperisini
- Panagrolaimus maestificus
- Panagrolaimus magnivulvatus
- Panagrolaimus migophilus
- Panagrolaimus moehni
- Panagrolaimus neotropicus
- Panagrolaimus orientalis
- Panagrolaimus orthotomici
- Panagrolaimus paetzoldi
- Panagrolaimus papillosus
- Panagrolaimus paradoxus
- Panagrolaimus paralongicaudatus
- Panagrolaimus picei
- Panagrolaimus rigidus
- Panagrolaimus ruehmi
- Panagrolaimus ruffoi
- Panagrolaimus salinus
- Panagrolaimus scheucherae
- Panagrolaimus sexdentati
- Panagrolaimus spondyli
- Panagrolaimus subelongatus
- Panagrolaimus superbus
- Panagrolaimus thiennemanni
- Panagrolaimus tigrodon
- Panagrolaimus trilabiatus
- Panagrolaimus verrucosus
- Panagrolaimus wichmanni
