= Turbatrix =

Scientific classification
- Domain: Eukaryota
- Kingdom: Animalia
- Phylum: Nematoda
- Class: Secernentea
- Order: Tylenchida
- Family: Panagrolaimidae
- Genus: Turbatrix; Peters, 1927

Genus of worms

Turbatrix is a genus of nematodes belonging to the family Panagrolaimidae.

The species of this genus are found in Europe.

Species:

- Turbatrix aceti (Müller, 1783) Peters, 1927
- Turbatrix dryophilus (Leuckart, 1877)
