= John N. Reeve =

Professor of Microbiology

John Newton Reeve is an American microbiologist who was the Department Chair of microbiology at Ohio State University, where he was Rod Sharp Professor of Microbiology. He received his bachelor's degree from the University of Birmingham, UK, in 1968, and a Ph.D. in microbiology from the University of British Columbia, Canada. He undertook Postdoctoral appointments at University of Arizona, 1971–1973 and at the Max Planck Institute, W. Berlin, 1974–1979.

He is well known as the discoverer of archaea histones, small DNA-binding proteins which are the precursors of histones in eukaryotes, as evidenced by his many published articles. He won a LExEN Award for his work "Longevity and Diversity of Microorganisms Entrapped in Tropical and Polar Ice Cores".

== Publications ==
- L'ubomíra Cubonová; Haruyuki Atomi; Tamotsu Kanai; Masahiro Katano; John N Reeve; Thomas J Santangelo An archaeal histone is required for transformation of Thermococcus kodakarensis.
- Thomas J Santangelo; L'ubomíra Cuboňová; John N Reeve Deletion of alternative pathways for reductant recycling in Thermococcus kodakarensis increases hydrogen production
- Zhuo Li; Miao Pan; John N Reeve; Thomas J Santangelo; Wei Yuan; Wiebke Chemnitz; James L Edwards; Jerard Hurwitz; Zvi Kelman A novel DNA nuclease is stimulated by association with the GINS complex.
