= Plectus parvus =

Scientific classification
- Kingdom: Animalia
- Phylum: Nematoda
- Class: Chromadorea
- Order: Plectida
- Family: Plectidae
- Genus: Plectus
- Species: P. parvus

Binomial name
- Plectus parvus Bastian, 1865

Species of freshwater and terrestrial roundworm

Plectus parvus is a species of nematode found in freshwater and terrestrial environments. It has been sampled in Europe and New Zealand. Along with the similar nematode Panagrolaimus detritophagus, in 2018 it was the first species of multicellular eukaryote to be thawed into a living state after prolonged cryopreservation. Female worms of this species were found in Pleistocene permafrost in the Kolyma River lowland (one of the sites was near the Alazeya River). They were mobile and ate, after being frozen for 30–40 thousand years.

== Taxonomy ==
Plectus parvus was described by the English zoologist Henry Charlton Bastian in 1865. The names Plectus potamogeti (Schneider, 1937) and Rhabdolaimus baltonicus (Daaday, 1894) are considered synonyms. Sources differ on its higher level taxonomy. The World Register of Marine Species places it in order Plectida, while the Integrated Taxonomic Information System places it in the order Araeolaimida.

== Anatomy ==
Adults of this species are reported to grow to 0.4–0.6 mm long. They possess two alae. The body is defended by a thin cuticle. The males possess asymmetrical spicules.

== Ecology ==
In the river sediments and soils it inhabits, this worm is part of the benthos group. It has been shown that interaction between this species and another soil nematode Bursilla monhysteria in damp podzols increases both bacterial biomass and nitrogen mineralisation. It is one of the nematodes present in estuarine mud, and because of the absence of quantifiable levels of megafauna present in more polluted sediments, these nematodes can be used to assess pollution levels.
