= Douglas N. C. Lin =

American planetary scientist (born 1949)

Douglas N. C. Lin (born May 7, 1949) is professor of astronomy and astrophysics at the University of California, Santa Cruz. He was born in New York and grew up in Beijing. He earned his BSc from McGill University, his PhD from the Institute of Astronomy, Cambridge University, and performed postdoctoral research at both Harvard and Cambridge. In 1979 he took an Assistant Professorship at UCSC, and has remained there since. He is also the founding director of the Kavli Institute for Astronomy and Astrophysics at Peking University.

Douglas Lin's principal research interests are in the origin of the Solar System, star formation, astrophysical fluid dynamics, dynamics of stellar clusters, structure of galaxies, active galactic nuclei, and galaxy formation.

As a mark of respect to his long history of contribution within astronomy, in 2009 Monash University held a symposium titled "Evolution of Planetary and Stellar Systems" (nicknamed "Linfest") in his honour. He also sits on the selection committee for the Astronomy award, given under the auspices of the Shaw Prize.

== Awards ==
- Guggenheim Fellow
- Otto Schmidt Medal
- von Humboldt Fellow
- Sackler Prize
- LExEN Award given by the National Science Foundation
- Member of selection committee from the Shaw Prize
- Member of American Academy of Arts and Sciences
- Founding director, Kavli Institute for Astronomy and Astrophysics
- Brouwer Award (2014)
- Bruce Medal (2015)
- Elected Fellow of the Royal Society (2026)

== Articles ==
- R. Spurzem, D. N. C. Lin. Orbit Evolution of Planetary Systems in Stellar Clusters
- Ji-Lin Zhou and Douglas N. C. Lina. Migration and Final Location of Hot Super Earths in the Presence of Gas Giants
- Douglas N.C. Lin and Ian Dobbs-Dixon. Diversity of close-in planets and the interactions with their host stars
- James Guillochon, Enrico Ramirez-Ruiz, Douglas N. C. Lin. Consequences of the Disruption and Ejection of Giant Planets
