= Tullis Onstott =

American geologist (1955–2021)

- Born: Tullis Cullen Onstott; January 12, 1955; Carlsbad, New Mexico, U.S.
- Died: October 19, 2021 (aged 66); Oracle, Arizona, U.S.
- Education: California Institute of Technology; Princeton University
- Scientific career
- Fields: Geology
- Workplaces: Princeton University
- Thesis: Paleomagnetism of the Guayana Shield, Venezuela and its implications concerning Proterozoic tectonics of South America and Africa (1981)
- Doctoral advisor: Robert B. Hargraves
- Other academic advisors: Derek York
- Website: https://onstott.princeton.edu/about

Tullis Onstott (January 12, 1955 – October 19, 2021) was a professor of geosciences at Princeton University who has done research into endolithic life deep under the Earth's surface. In 2011 he co-discovered Halicephalobus mephisto, a nematode worm living 0.9–3.6 km (0.56–2.24 mi) under the ground, the deepest multicellular organism known to science. He won a LExEN Award for his work "A Window Into the Extreme Environment of Deep Subsurface Microbial Communities: Witwatersrand Deep Microbiology Project". In 2007, Onstott was listed among Time Magazine's 100 most influential people in the world.

== Life and education ==
Onstott attended the California Institute of Technology and was awarded a B.S. in Geophysics in 1976. He later moved to Princeton University to earn a M.A. in 1978 and later a Ph.D. in 1980, both in Geology, under the direction of Robert B. Hargraves. After receiving his doctoral degree, Onstott, spent the next three years as a postdoctoral fellow in Derek York's laboratory at the University of Toronto performing research involving 40Ar/39Ar geochronology, before returning to Princeton as a professor. Onstott died October 19, 2021, after a long illness.

== Research ==
Research projects include:

- South African Deep Microbiology: characterizing the microbiology and geochemistry of continental crust down to 5 km (3.1 mi).
- Indiana-Princeton-Tennessee Astrobiology Institute: preparing for the search for life beneath the surface of Mars.
- Natural Earthquake Laboratory in South African Mines: installed a field laboratory at 3.8 km (2.4 mi) depth, exploring the relationship between seismic activity and microbial diversity and activity.
- Anaerobic biostimulation for the in situ precipitation and long-term sequestration of metal sulphides.

The first two research projects were done in collaboration with stable isotope biogeochemist and colleague Lisa Pratt of Indiana University.

His work on these projects and others is detailed in his book Deep Life: The Hunt for the Hidden Biology of Earth, Mars, and Beyond published by Princeton University Press in 2016.
