= Halicephalobus gingivalis =

Halicocephalus gingivalis

Scientific classification
- Kingdom: Animalia
- Phylum: Nematoda
- Class: Secernentea
- Order: Tylenchida
- Family: Panagrolaimidae
- Genus: Halicephalobus
- Species: H. gingivalis

Binomial name
- Halicephalobus gingivalis (Stefanski, 1954)

Synonyms
- Micronema deletrix, Halicephalobus deletrix.

Species of roundworm

Halicephalobus gingivalis is a free-living saprophagous nematode species identified and named in 1954 by Stefanski. It is a facultative parasite of horses, invading the nasal cavity, and sometimes numerous other areas, where it produces granulomatous masses. On rare occasion, it can infect humans as well, in whom it is invariably fatal. Based on studies performed on infected horses in Florida, the parasite is associated with swampland environments. These worms are dioecious, with female and male organs having been found in separate individuals. Eggs and immature larvae have been found in tissue samples, indicating an asexual reproductive cycle, and free-living males have been found in soil environments, indicating that sexual reproduction also occurs. The site of entry for the parasite is thought to be through breaks in the skin or through mucous membranes. This nematode is now distributed worldwide, as cases of equine infections have been found in Canada, Florida, the Nordic regions, and Arabian horses alike.

== Morphology ==
The genital tract in the advanced fourth stage female of H. gingivalis is Uterus didelphys (twinned uteri) and amphidelphic (uteri opposed) and terminal ends of the uterine horns are reflected, the anterior one ventrally, the posterior one dorsally. Adults are 235–460 μm long. In the parthenogenic adult, the posterior branch forms a short ovary, whereas most of the anterior branch becomes a combined uterus–oviduct. The worm has a conical, asymmetrical tail that is shorter on the ventral side.

== Life cycle and habitation ==
This is a facultative parasite whose stages remain unclear. It dwells actively in soil, around plants and other organically rich environments including manure and compost.

== Prevalence of infection ==
According to a 1997 paper, neurohelminthiases in general are more prevalent where environmental factors and poor sanitation assist the spread of parasitism between man and animals, and have been facilitated by population shifts and improved transport. Neurohelminthiases are often not diagnosed because they are unfamiliar; diagnostic tests are not easily available. Neurohelminthiases in general are not common in the United States.

== Effects on health ==
H. gingivalis is a rare infection in humans, but causes a universally lethal meningoencephalitis. This disease shows greatly increased concentration of eosinophils in the cerebrospinal fluid. In horses (where the parasite is most studied), infection of the brain is common, followed by the kidneys, oral and nasal cavities, lymph nodes, lungs, spinal cord, and adrenal gland, and also reports of infection of heart, liver, stomach and bone. An extremely rare triple fatality from this worm was reported in Wales after kidneys from a man experiencing homelessness and alcohol addiction who ultimately died of an unknown meningitis were transplanted into two recipients.

== Treatment ==
All known cases of human infections were only found post mortem and had been fatal; they had not been treated with antihelminthic drugs (such as ivermectin and benzimidazole). In animals, these drugs are mostly ineffective, as they do not cross the blood–brain barrier.

== Further research ==
When there is occurrence of a neurohelminthic disease, it is fatal, as there exist no tests that can be done to identify these species and apply effective treatment. These nematodes seem to exhibit neurotropism, but their life cycle, mode of infection and risk factors are not yet clearly understood.

== History ==
This organism was described in 1954 by Stefanski.
