= LExEN =

Research program

LExEN, an acronym for Life in Extreme Environments, is a research program overseen by the National Science Foundation. It was originally developed by G. Michael Purdy in 1997 as an area of research in which scientists could seek funding for activities in the polar regions. Participating were the Directorates for Biological Sciences, Mathematical and Physical Sciences, Engineering, Geosciences, and the Office of Polar Programs of the National Science Foundation. The program sought to place a strong emphasis upon those life-supporting environments that exist near the extremes of planetary conditions. The study of extreme habitats, both planetary and extra-planetary, was underpinned by the idea that "deep understanding of certain earth-bound microbial systems would provide important insights into life-sustaining processes and the origin of life on our own planet, while illuminating the search for life in other planetary environments."

In 1999 it was announced that the future of LExEN was still under consideration but despite the lack of research in the topic, the program no longer appears on the NSF A-Z Index of Funding Opportunities.

== LExEN Award Winners ==
- Jan P. Amend Washington University in St. Louis Growth Media for Hyperthermophiles: Geochemical Constraints on Realistic Carbon and Energy Sources in Shallow Marine Hydrothermal Systems
- Ariel D. Anbar University of Rochester Biogenic Fractionations of Transition Metal Isotopes: Novel Methods for the Examination of Life in Extreme Environments
- Douglas H. Bartlett Scripps Institution of Oceanography Characterization of the Upper Pressure Limits for Microbial Life
- Don K. Button University of Alaska Characteristics of Bacteria Native to Extremely Dilute Environments
- David A. Caron Woods Hole Oceanographic Institution Protistan Biodiversity in Antarctic Marine Ecosystems: Molecular Biological and Traditional Approaches
- James P. Cowen University of Hawaii Collaborative Research: Development of Capability to Measure Proxides of Microbial Activity Within Ocean Crust
- Christian H. Fritsen Montana State University Collaborative Research: Microbial Life within the Extreme Environment Posed by Permanent Antarctic Lake Ice
- John E. Hobbie Marine Biological Laboratory Ecology of Microbial Systems in Extreme Environments: The Role of Nanoflagellates in Cold and Nutrient-Poor Arctic Freshwaters
- Holger W. Jannasch Woods Hole Oceanographic Institution New Physiological and Phylogenetic Types of Hyperthermophiles at Deep-Sea Hydrothermal Vents
- Eric L.N. Jensen Arizona State University Prospects for Life on Planets in Binary Star Systems
- James F. Kasting The Pennsylvania State University. Collaborative Research: Methanogenesis and the Climate of Early Mars
- Douglas N. C. Lin University of California Habitable Planets and Satellites in the Outer Solar System
- Derek R. Lovley University of Massachusetts Fe (III)-and Humics-Reducing Microorganisms in Extreme Environments
- George W. Luther University of Delaware Collaborative Research: Pyrite, a Crucial Mineral and Surface for Microbial Life in Extreme Hydro thermal Environments
- Tullis C. Onstott Princeton University A Window Into the Extreme Environment of Deep Subsurface Microbial Communities: Witwatersrand Deep Microbiology Project
- Frederick A. Rainey Louisiana State University Combining Culturing and Non-Culturing Approaches for the Isolation of Prokaryotes from a Hyper Arid Desert Environment
- William S. Reeburgh University of California Experimental Studies on Hydrogen Biogeochemistry in Anoxic Environments
- John N. Reeve Ohio State University Longevity and Diversity of Microorganisms Entrapped in Tropical and Polar Ice Cores
- David A. Stahl Northwestern University Diversity and Habitat Range of Sulfate-Reducing Microorganisms
- Gordon T. Taylor SUNY at Stony Brook Biology and Ecology of South Pole Snow Microbes
- Thomas C. Vogelmann University of Wyoming The Snow Alga Chlamydomonas nivalis: Photosynthesis Under the Greatest Extremes of High Light, UV-B Radiation and Low Temperature on Earth
- Russell H. Vreeland West Chester University Paleobiology of Ancient Salt Formations: Examination of Primary Crystals for Biological Materials

== See also ==
- List of ecology awards
- List of environmental awards
