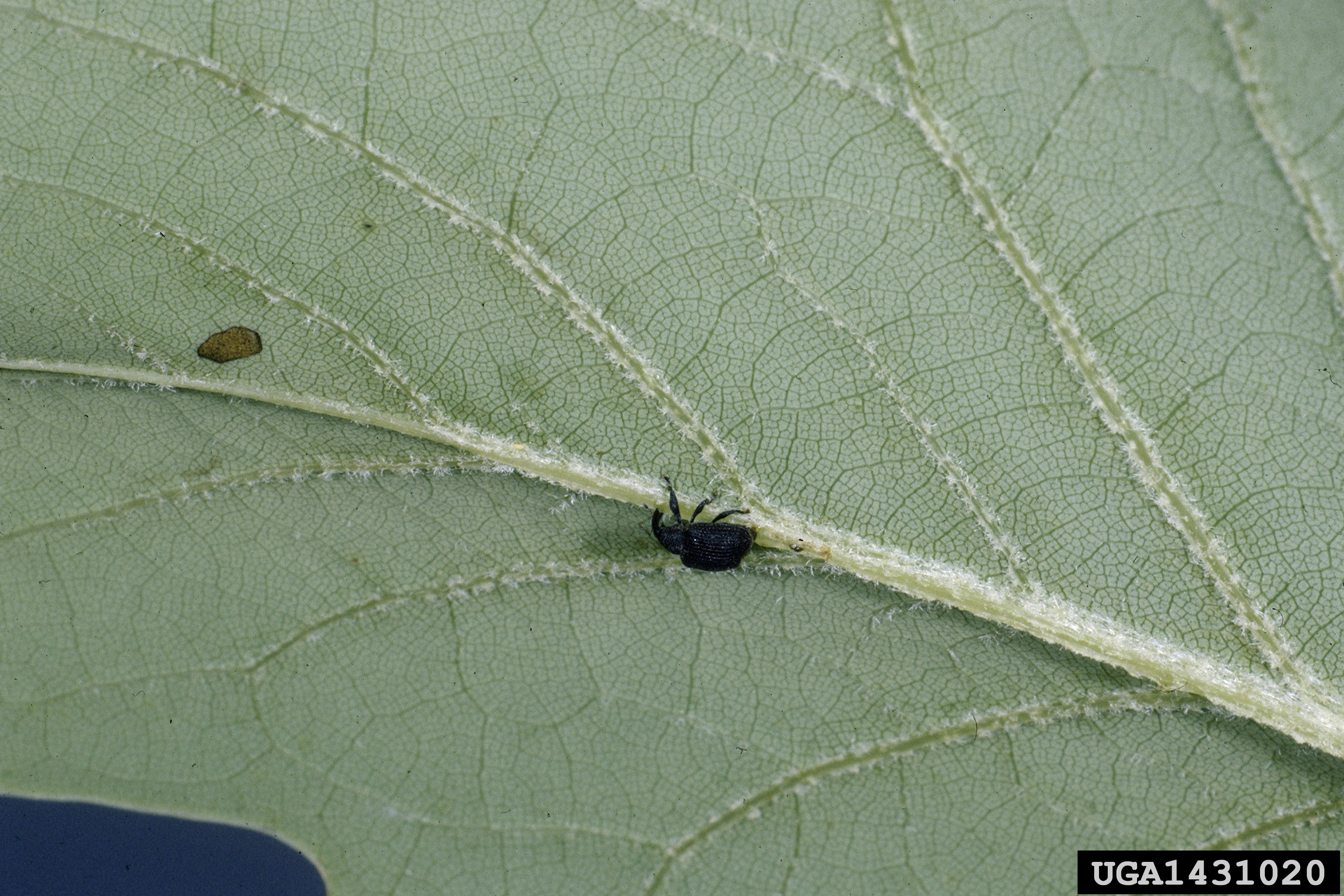

Scientific classification
- Domain: Eukaryota
- Kingdom: Animalia
- Phylum: Arthropoda
- Class: Insecta
- Order: Coleoptera
- Suborder: Polyphaga
- Infraorder: Cucujiformia
- Family: Curculionidae
- Genus: Odontopus; Say, 1831
- Species: O. calceatus

Binomial name
- Odontopus calceatus (Say, 1831)

= Odontopus calceatus =

Species of beetle

Odontopus calceatus is a species of weevil which occurs in much of the eastern and southeastern United States. It is the only species in the genus Odontopus. Its range is as far north as Massachusetts all the way south to the Gulf of Mexico, and from the Atlantic westward to the Mississippi River. Common names include yellow poplar weevil, sassafras mining weevil, tuliptree leafminer, tulip tree weevil, or the magnolia leaf miner.

== Biology ==
Yellow poplar weevils are small black-snouted beetles and are tick-like in appearance. While in its larval stage, the weevil presents as a white legless grub. Measuring approximately 1/16 inch (0.2 cm) long, the adult weevils are normally black or dark brown in coloring. While most weevils are a solid color it has been noted that some southern populations exhibit yellow antenna. Its protruding snout can lead them sometimes to be confused with a tick.

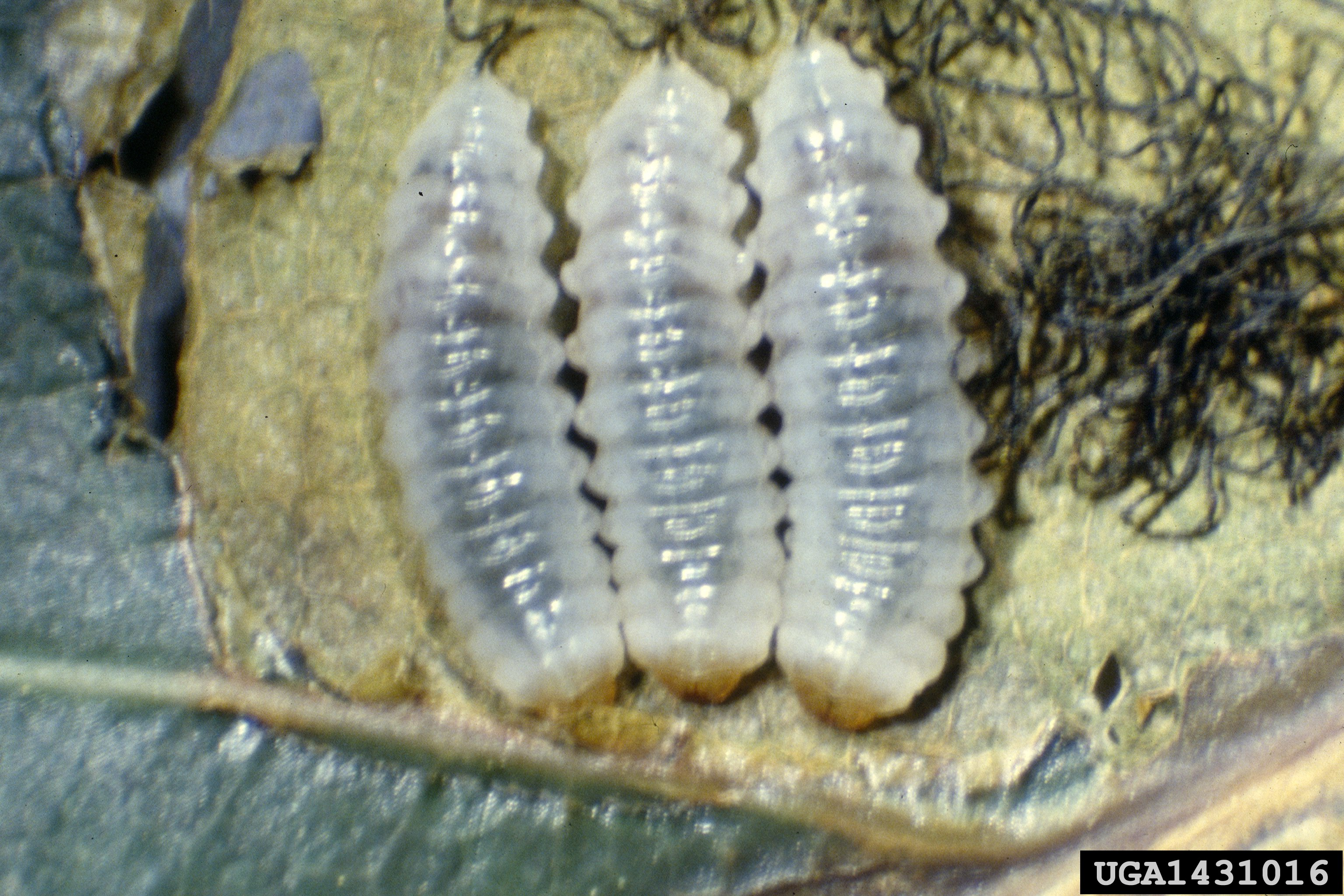
Larvae of the yellow poplar weevil

The weevil goes through a single life-cycle each year. Adults pass the winter months in surrounding leaf litter and become active throughout late April and early May. Before leaf buds on yellow-poplar, sassafras, or magnolia trees open, weevils attack the buds and leave their distinctive feeding marks. Mating takes place throughout May and early June. The eggs are laid in the midrib on the underside of leaves, about one to three eggs per site. There are generally four or five punctures at each oviposition site, resulting in 12 to 15 eggs per leaf. The eggs hatch in a few days to reveal legless, C-shaped grubs. Newly hatched larvae move from the midrib into the leaf where they feed as leaf miners for three to four weeks. Once they are ready to pupate, the grubs spin reddish-brown cocoons in one of the main mining halls they created as larvae. They remain in these cocoons until the second week of June where they then emerge as adults. The new adults then continue on their journey to eat yet more leaves until mid or late July. From this time onward, they generally disappear into new leaf litter to await the coming spring months.

== Distribution ==
The yellow poplar weevil usually is found in yellow-poplar, sassafras, and magnolia trees. Its distribution is east of the Mississippi River in all areas where its native hosts exist. It has been noted that its preferred host is yellow-poplar. Historically, infestations are localized within natural hardwood forests and have rarely been considered a major threat. However, during the 1960s, several outbreaks caused serious loss of foliage on yellow-poplar populations in the Ohio River Valley and Appalachian Mountain regions. Recent concerns focus on young yellow-poplar transplants that are placed in urban and suburban landscapes. Severe infestations in saplings could damage tree foliage, reduce their ornamental value, and possibly cause low survival rates.

== Description of damage and means of control ==
Adult weevils create brown, rice-sized feeding pits. They chew through the leaf epidermis, and if prolonged feeding continues can create small holes in the leaves. Large weevil infestations can also cause severe leaf browning. Weevil larvae are internal miners and will eat the midrib of the leaf as they mature. Mined leaves will eventually break if enough injury occurs. While these weevils do harm foliage they shouldn't affect the overall health and longevity of established trees. They are often more of a nuisance than a serious problem and generally only create aesthetic harm.

Most years, natural pests keep weevil populations in check - parasites sometimes destroy more than half the pupae populations. It has been noted that parasite control may fail every several years. There are also chemical controls available that can be used to eliminate adults and larvae. One should apply contact or stomach insecticides as soon as the first adult feeding spots are noticed on host leaves. A rule of thumb is to apply the insecticide when feeding damage accumulates to 10% or more throughout foliage. Since the spring adults feed and move during April to early June, a second application may be needed. Systemics are used to combat larvae. It is best to apply systemics when the eggs have just been laid or while larval mines are green in color.
