= Panagrellus =

Scientific classification
- Kingdom: Animalia
- Phylum: Nematoda
- Class: Secernentea
- Order: Tylenchida
- Family: Panagrolaimidae
- Genus: Panagrellus; Thorne, 1938

Genus of roundworms

Panagrellus is a genus of nematodes in the family Panagrolaimidae. commonly found in Northern America. These tiny worms often thrive in decaying matter and in moist environments, with some species, like Panagrellus redivivus, popularly known as “microworms,” frequently used as live food for fish in aquaculture.

Species:

- Panagrellus dorsobidentata (Ruhm, 1956)
- Panagrellus dubius
- Panagrellus filiformis (Sukul, 1971)
- Panagrellus ludwigi (de Man, 1910)
- Panagrellus nepenthicola (Menzel, 1922)
- Panagrellus pycnus Thorne, 1938
- Panagrellus redividus Thorne, 1938
- Panagrellus redivivoides (Goodey, 1943)
- Panagrellus redivivus (Linnaeus, 1767)
- Panagrellus ulmi Abolafia, Alizadeh & Khakvar, 2016
- Panagrellus ventrodentatus (Heindl-Mengert, 1956)
