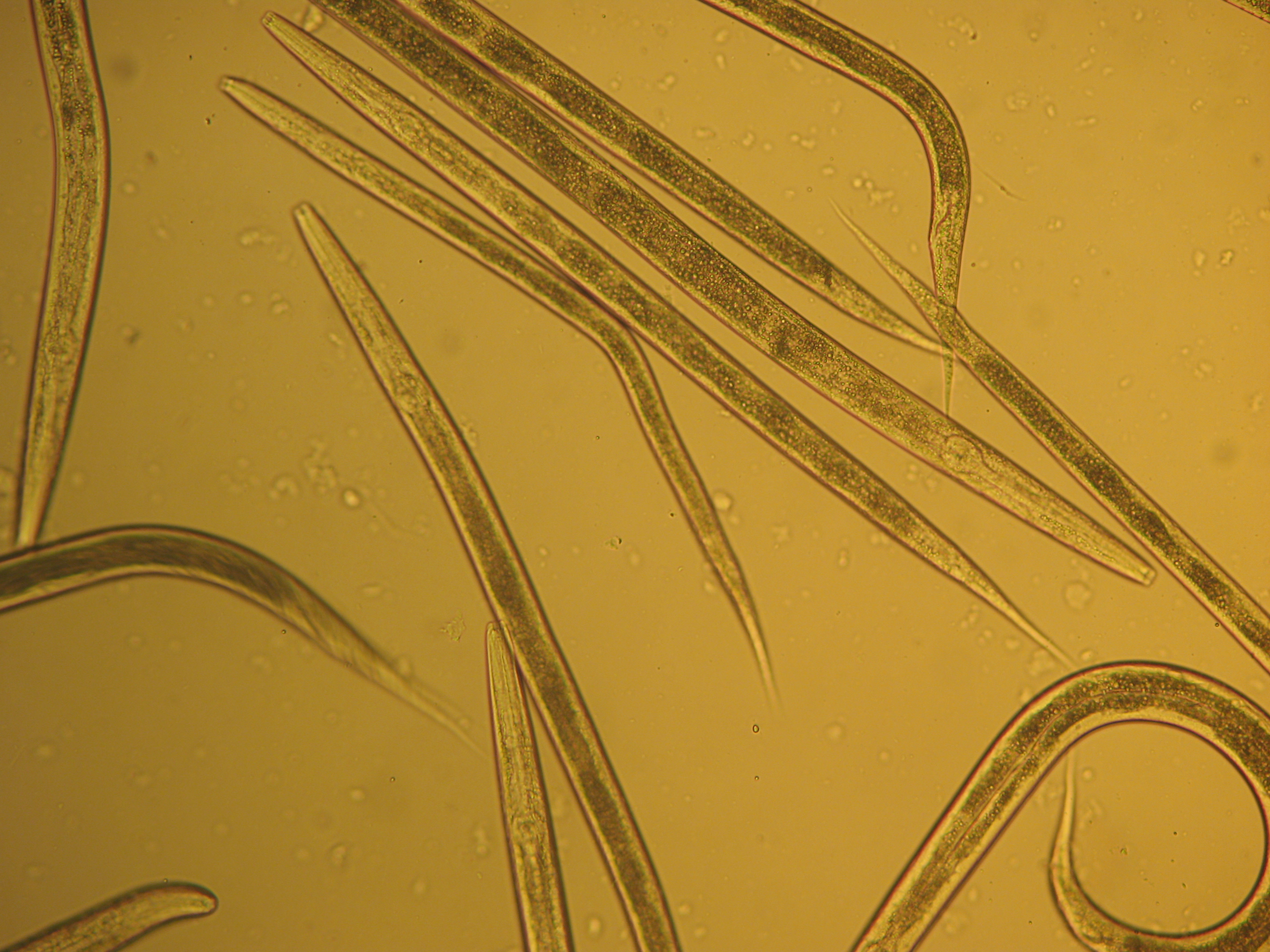
- Observation of Panagrellus redivivus on a Zeiss microscope stage

Scientific classification
- Kingdom: Animalia
- Phylum: Nematoda
- Class: Chromadorea
- Order: Rhabditida
- Family: Panagrolaimidae
- Genus: Panagrellus
- Species: P. redivivus

Binomial name
- Panagrellus redivivus (Linnaeus, 1767)

Synonyms
- Chaos redivivum Linnaeus, 1767; Vibrio anguillula Müller, 1773; Vibrio glutinis Müller, 1783; Anguillula glutinis (Müller, 1783) Müller, 1786; Anguillula rediviva Müller, 1786; Rhabditis glutinis (Müller, 1783) Dujardin, 1845; Turbatrix rediviva (Müller, 1783) Peters, 1927; Turbator silusiae (de Man, 1913) Peters, 1927; Turbator redivivus (Linnaeus, 1767) Peters, 1927; Panagrellus leucocephalus (Steiner, 1936) Goodey 1945; Panagrellus redivivus (Linnaeus, 1767) Goodey, 1945; Neocephalobus leucocephalus Steiner, 1936; Cephalobus parasiticus Sandground, 1939; Turbator leucocephalus (Steiner, 1936) Goodey, 1945; Panagrellus silusiae (de Man, 1913) Goodey, 1945

= Panagrellus redivivus =

Species of roundworm

The free-living nematode Panagrellus redivivus (sour paste nematode, or beer mat nematode from its occurrence in constantly moist felt beer mats), is known to many aquarium enthusiasts and fish keepers as the microworm. It is a tiny roundworm used as the first food for larger kinds of newly-hatched fish, such as larval common carp. The microworm is widely used in aquaculture as food for a variety of fish and crustacean species.

One of thirteen currently recognized species of Panagrellus, P. redivivus is about 50 μm in diameter and just over 1 mm in length, barely visible to the naked eye. Subsisting on yeast, it is easily cultured at home on a substrate of flour paste or porridge inoculated with dry yeast. Females reach maturity in about three days and deliver live young rather than eggs, as most nematodes produce.

The microworm has been used in genetic analysis studies, but not nearly as universally as its relative, Caenorhabditis elegans.

In Vietnamese cuisine, it is common to use lactic-fermented yeast rice, or cơm mẻ, which contains the microworm (con mẻ) along with fermenting bacteria and yeast, to create a sour flavor in dishes.
