= Panagrolaimidae =

Scientific classification
- Domain: Eukaryota
- Kingdom: Animalia
- Phylum: Nematoda
- Class: Secernentea
- Order: Tylenchida
- Superfamily: Panagrolaimoidea
- Family: Panagrolaimidae

Family of nematodes

Panagrolaimidae is a family of nematodes belonging to the order Rhabditida.

Genera:

- Anguilluloides Ruhm, 1956
- Baldwinema Atighi, Pourjam, Bert, Pedram, Ghaemi & Panahandeh, 2016
- Baujardia Bert, De Ley, Segers, Van Driessche & De Ley, 2003
- Halicephalobus Timm, 1956
- Indocephalobus Mondal & Manna, 2014
- Macrolaimus Maupas, 1900
- Micronema Körner, 1954
- Mukhina Özdikmen, 2010
- Panagrellus Thorne, 1938
- Panagrobelium Andrassy, 1984
- Panagrobelus Thorne
- Panagrodontus Thorne, 1935
- Panagrolaimus Fuchs, 1930
- Panagromacra Massey, 1964
- Plectonchus Fuchs, 1930
- Procephalobus Steiner, 1934
- Propanagrolaimus Andrássy, 2005
- Shahnema Siddiqi, 2014
- Tricephalobus Steiner, 1936
- Trilabiatus Goodey, 1963
- Turbatrix Peters, 1927
