= List of people who arranged for cryonics =

This list contains notable people who plan to be or have been cryopreserved after legal death.

== Living people who plan to be cryopreserved ==
- Steve Aoki
- Gregory Benford
- Nick Bostrom
- Anthony Bourbon
- Mike Darwin
- Kim Eric Drexler
- Maria Entraigues-Abramson
- William Faloon
- Robert A. Freitas Jr.
- Patri Friedman
- Ugly Dave Gray
- Aubrey de Grey
- James L. Halperin
- Robin Hanson
- Keith Henson
- Todd Huffman
- Ray Kurzweil
- Keith Lofstrom
- Curtis Lovell II
- Seth MacFarlane
- Max Marty
- Charles Matthau
- Ralph Merkle
- Robert Miller
- Ole Martin Moen
- Max More
- Luke Nosek
- David Pearce
- Allan Pease
- Christine Peterson
- Martine Rothblatt
- Anders Sandberg
- Carol Shaw
- Peter Thiel
- Edward O. Thorp
- Natasha Vita-More
- Anthony Waller
- Eliezer Yudkowsky

== Deceased people who have been cryopreserved ==
- James Bedford, 1967
- Dora Kent, 1987
- Dick Clair, 1988
- Bredo Morstøl, 1989
- Jerry Leaf, 1991
- Phil Salin, 1991
- FM-2030, 2000
- Frank Cole, 2000
- Ted Williams, 2002
- John Henry Williams, 2004
- Gregory Yob, 2005
- Thomas K. Donaldson, 2006
- Curtis Henderson, 2009
- Robert Ettinger, 2011
- Frederick Chamberlain, 2012
- Hal Finney, 2014
- L. Stephen Coles, 2014
- Marvin Minsky, 2016
- Li Zehou, 2021
- Peter Eckersley, 2022
- Saul Kent, 2023
- Don Laughlin, 2023
