= Curtis Henderson =

American lawyer

Curtis Henderson (September 28, 1926 – June 25, 2009) was a pioneer in the practice of cryonics.

== Personal background ==
Henderson graduated from Pennsylvania Military College (now Widener University) and Temple University law school. He passed the New York bar exam. For ten years he worked as an attorney (claims adjuster) for an automobile insurance company (Hardware Mutuals) and later for The Hartford.

Henderson had three sons from two wives. One of his sons was named "Rob", after Robert Ettinger. His oldest son is James Crawford Henderson. Both of Henderson's two wives divorced him in large part because of his cryonics activities. The intense hostility of Henderson's second wife to cryonics inspired Mike Darwin to begin a study of the many cases where "hostile spouses or girlfriends have prevented, reduced or reversed the involvement of their male partner in cryonics."

Henderson died on June 25, 2009, and is cryopreserved at the Cryonics Institute.

== Organizational activities ==
The first cryonics-related organization in New York City was a branch of Evan Cooper's Washington, D.C.–based Life Extension Society (LES). James Sutton, the New York LES coordinator and others became frustrated with LES when Cooper refused to give names and addresses of New Yorkers who had contacted Cooper. Deciding to form a new organization, Sutton arranged a meeting in August 1965 that included Curtis Henderson, Saul Kent and a designer named Karl Werner. At the meeting, Karl Werner coined the word "cryonics", and the new organization was called the Cryonics Society of New York (CSNY). Henderson soon became the President.

Curtis Henderson and Saul Kent spent October 1966 touring the United States to assist in the consolidation of the nascent cryonics movement. On October 2 they attended a meeting in Oak Park, Michigan, which led to the formation of the Cryonics Society of Michigan, with Robert Ettinger as President. On October 14 they attended a meeting in Woodland Hills, California where it was agreed to incorporate the Cryonics Society of California (CSC), with Robert Nelson as President. (The following January, CSC cryopreserved the first man, Dr. James Bedford.)

On March 2, 1968, CSNY held its first Annual Cryonics Conference at the New York Academy of Sciences, a meeting attended by over one hundred people. In July 1968 CSNY cryopreserved its first patient, Steven Mandell.

In 1969 Cryo-Span Corporation was created to specialize in the technical and business aspects of cryopreservation, as distinct from the educational and administrative activities of CSNY. Curtis Henderson, Saul Kent and Paul Segall were the Cryo-Span Directors, but in practice Curtis Henderson was responsible for maintaining the patients in liquid nitrogen. In 1974, the State of New York Department of Public Health informed Curtis Henderson that cryonics was in violation of the law and that continued cryopreservation would be fined at a rate of $1,000 per day. The bodies of the three CSNY patients being maintained were returned to their relatives.

Henderson was unusual as a pioneer who was ruthlessly honest about the limitations of cryonics. He admonished his contemporaries with aphorisms such as "There is no such thing as feelgood cryonics," meaning that optimism and faith in the future should never be allowed to distract advocates from the hard choices, challenges, and inadequacies of procedures in the real world. After grim personal experiences he became an advocate for "no third-party funding," referring to the practice (now obsolete) of accepting cases funded by a third party such as a spouse, child, or sibling of the deceased who might promise to make installment payments but almost invariably would cease doing so after a relatively short period, thus leaving the cryonics organization to deal with the problem of maintenance.

Curtis Henderson continued to be active in cryonics as a Member of Alcor Life Extension Foundation, CryoCare Foundation and most recently the Cryonics Institute until his death on June 25, 2009. He was cryopreserved on July 3, 2009.

== See also ==
- Cryonics
- Life extension
