= Fred and Linda Chamberlain =

Founders of Alcor Life Extension Foundation

Frederick Rockwell Chamberlain III (November 21, 1935 – March 22, 2012) and Linda Chamberlain founded the cryonics organization Alcor Life Extension Foundation. Their long and continued history of activism in cryonics make them among the most well-known cryonics pioneers. David Pascal wrote in the November/December 2005 issue of the Mensa Bulletin that, second to the man credited with the original idea for cryonics, Robert Ettinger, the Chamberlains have contributed more than anyone to the field of cryonics.

== Cryonics ==
Fred and Linda Chamberlain met in 1970 as a result of their mutual interest in cryonics. They were both on a committee to organize the Third National Conference On Cryonics sponsored by the Cryonics Society of California (CSC). Fred worked at the Jet Propulsion Laboratory as one of its space program engineers and was married with two children. However, his and Linda's partners did not share their interest in cryonics.

Fred and Linda became a couple and devoted themselves to cryonics, formed a cryonics corporation (Manrise) and wrote the first detailed procedure manual for cryonics that had ever existed. By the spring of 1971, they were legally married and were preparing to give a presentation on their procedures manual, complete with a working prototype of a perfusion system, at the Fourth National Conference On Cryonics in San Francisco.

There was strong resistance to taking cryonics into high technology too quickly, within CSC, and there were other problems, including almost total secrecy as to how CSC's decisions were made and how it was organized and operated. By the summer of 1971, these stresses were beginning to weaken their confidence in CSC, and they felt that they were forced to withdraw from it and pursue some other route.

== Fred's father ==
Fred's father was a very fragile stroke victim, so they formed a new cryonics organization they named Alcor early in 1972, and (through Manrise Corporation) assisted with the founding of Trans Time, Inc in the San Francisco Bay area (providing its first perfusion equipment by a contractual arrangement). Cryonics pioneer Mike Darwin moved to California and became the technological core of Alcor for over a year, during which he conducted the first organized research ever done in cryonics on a dedicated basis, supported by Manrise Corporation. Attempts to raise capital for continued research through a new corporation failed, and Mike Darwin returned to his home in Indianapolis, Indiana.

Fred's father was cryopreserved in the summer of 1976, the first neuropreservation ever. Fred's father was stored under contract at Trans Time, Inc. Alcor's board of directors was expanded, its methods of electing Directors were changed, Jerry Leaf became part of the cryonics team, and there was a merger of Manrise Corporation with Trans Time, Inc. All of these developments considerably improved the strength of Alcor and the cryonics movement. After 1976, the Chamberlains preferred others to run day-to-day operations of Alcor.

Fred and Linda then moved to Lake Tahoe, Nevada and started a new property management business, Paradise Rentals. They became the hosts for an annual "Lake Tahoe Life Extension Festival", until 1986. It started because as part of the merger of Manrise Corporation with Trans Time, Inc., Linda became a director of Trans Time, Inc. as well as of Alcor. In the 1970s in association with the cryonics conferences they were holding at Lake Tahoe, the Chamberlains wrote a series of cryonics-related short stories, and published those stories along with stories by other cryonicists and transhumanists. Entitled LifeQuest: Dozens of Stories about Cryonics, Uploading, and other Transhuman Adventures, the book was republished in 2009.

== Linda's mother ==
Linda's mother Arlene Fried attended one of the festivals, and with Linda's urging joined Alcor and maintained arrangements for several years. Then, she developed terminal cancer that had been unsuspected until the last moment. Alcor mobilized a highly supported remote standby for that. Both Jerry Leaf and Mike Darwin were on hand for nearly a week in Sonoma, California, as Linda's mother went through the final stages of a deliberate dehydration on her part, with hospice support. The outcome was a very high-quality cryopreservation for the time (1990), the best of its kind at that date.

== Bankruptcy and subsequent events ==
In 1993, concerned that Alcor was in danger of political chaos, Alcor employee Hugh Hixon persuaded the Chamberlains to become involved with Alcor's activities and in the fall of that year, amidst much turmoil, Fred was elected as an Alcor Director, and the Chamberlains accompanied Alcor in its move to Scottsdale, Arizona. In February 1997, Steve Bridge resigned as President of Alcor, and the Chamberlains offered to devote themselves to Alcor full-time. Fred became Alcor President and Linda became the Suspension Manager (the person responsible for application of cryopreservation protocol).

Alcor was in a difficult position when the Chamberlains came on board, as to maintaining pace with technology advances and paying for its staff at the same time. A Life Membership program was initiated, and a supporting corporation was formed by Linda to take over the responsibilities for cryopreservation services (BioTransport, Inc.), following the patterns established earlier by Manrise Corporation, Trans Time, Inc., and Cryovita Corporation (Jerry Leaf's start-up cryonics provider organization). Many difficulties in raising capital and finding the right mix of people led to the subsidiary for cell storage (Cells4Life, Inc.), and failure to raise capital finally forced both corporations into a defunct state.

The Chamberlains had signed for all of the unsecured debt and leases of equipment in both of these corporations (BioTransport, Inc. and Cells4Life, Inc.). In the collapse of these and in the context of an unresolved dispute with Alcor over reimbursement of BioTransport, Inc. for expenses incurred in launching Alcor's vitrification program, the Chamberlains liquidated their life insurance policies for cryonics arrangements and finally had to file bankruptcy. The circumstances of Linda's forced resignation as President of Alcor only a few months after assuming this role, together with their failure to resolve financial matters with Alcor as mentioned above, finally led to the Chamberlains joining the Cryonics Institute (CI) in July 2002, but they went back to being Alcor Members in March, 2011.

Linda Chamberlain wrote the science fiction novel Star Pebble that explored the question of how to define life, which was published in 2010.

== Death ==
Fred died and was cryopreserved on March 22, 2012, by Alcor Life Extension Foundation.

== See also ==
- Life extension

== Notes ==
- 1. Manrise Corporation procedures manual
