= American Cryonics Society =

Nonprofit organization

- Founded: December 10, 1969; 56 years ago
- Founder: Dr. M. Coleman Harris, Edgar Swank, Dr. Grace Talbot, Jerome B. White
- Tax ID no.: 94-2398719
- Registration no.: C0587199
- Purpose: Cryonics
- Location: 355 W Olive, Ste 210 Sunnyvale, California 94086
- Coordinates: 37°22′17.1048″N 122°2′8.718″W
- Website: americancryonics.org
- Formerly called: Bay Area Cryonics Society

The American Cryonics Society (ACS), also known as the Cryonics Society of America, is a member-run, California-based, 501(c)(3) tax-exempt nonprofit organization that supports and promotes research and education into cryonics and cryobiology. The American Cryonics Society is the oldest cryonics organization still in existence.

== History ==
The American Cryonics Society was first incorporated in 1969 in San Francisco as the Bay Area Cryonics Society (BACS); its name was changed to the American Cryonics Society in 1985. The founding of the company followed over two years of organizational meetings by cryonics activists. Signers of the founding charter included two well-known Bay Area physicians, Dr. M. Coleman Harris, and Dr. Grace Talbot. The 1969 incorporation date makes it the oldest cryonics society still in existence. The Immortalist Society (IS), with which the American Cryonics Society works closely, is a successor to the Cryonics Society of Michigan whose founding predates that of the American Cryonics Society.

In 1978, the Cryonics Society of America researchers collaborated with Jerry Leaf of Cryovita Laboratories in experiments that would apply the methodology to cryonic suspensions that were then in use as surgical procedures to treat patients with heart disease. Thus a team led by a thoracic surgeon and a perfusionist would use cardio-pulmonary resuscitation equipment and blood-pumps to quickly cool a patient, and replace his blood with a blood substitute containing cryoprotectants. For several years thereafter, Cryovita Laboratories led by Jerry Leaf and Mike Darwin, were responsible for the initial cryonic suspension of patients of the American Cryonics Society, which were then perfused, transported, and kept in cryogenic storage by Trans Time.

In 2002 when CryoSpan opted to close down its long-term cryogenic storage operations, 10 ACS patients and a number of pets were transferred to the Cryonics Institute (CI) facility in Michigan. The American Cryonics Society had contracted with CI for the long-term cryogenic storage of a number of other members prior to the 2002 patient transfer. The ACS inspects CI yearly to ensure ACS quality standards are met. The extra funds charged to ACS members beyond CI minimums could be used for moving the patients in the future if necessary, or other uses.

== See also ==
- Charles Platt (science-fiction author)
- Robert Ettinger
