= Shandong Yinfeng Life Science Research Institute =

Cryonics Organization and Life Science Research Institute

The Shandong Yinfeng Life Science Research Institute (Chinese: 山东银丰生命科学研究院), is a life science research institute and a cryonics services provider in Jinan, Shandong, China. It was founded in 2015, and it is a division of Yinfeng Biological Group. The institute is the first organization providing cryonics services in China. In 2017, the institute stored the first cryopreserved corpse in China. The institute cryopreserves cells, tissues, human bodies, and animals, including dogs. The institute cooperates closely with the Shandong Yinfeng Life Science Foundation (founded in December 2016) that funds the institute.

== History and organization structure ==
Yinfeng Group was founded in 1999. Yinfeng Biological Group, a division of Yinfeng Group, was founded in 2011. The Shandong Yinfeng Life Science Research Institute (founded in 2015) is a division of the Yinfeng Biological Group. Yinfeng Biological Group's work include DNA testing, cord blood storage, aesthetic medicine and stem cell research.

Before the Shandong Yinfeng Life Science Research Institute was established, Chinese people can only take cryonics services from institutions located outside of China, such as Alcor Life Extension Foundation, Cryonics Institute (United States), or KrioRus (Russia).

== Research Area ==
The institute is focusing on the development of cryopreservation, resuscitation of organs, tissues, and human body research in the field of cryogenic medicine and life sciences. It conducts research with universities University of Science and Technology of China on preserving pancreatic cells and Shandong University’s Qilu Hospital on preserving ovarian cells.

== Cryonics Services ==
The Institute provide the first cryopreservation service in China in 2017, with the preservation of Zhan Wenlian (Chinese: 展文莲) who died from lung cancer.

== See also ==
- Cryonics
- Alcor Life Extension Foundation
- Cryonics Institute
- KrioRus
