= KrioRus =

Russian cryonics company

- Native name: КриоРус
- Company type: Limited liability partnership
- Industry: Cryonics; Cryopreservation
- Founded: 2006 (20 years ago)
- Founder: Danila Medvedev; Valerya Udalova (Note: Nine people.)
- Headquarters: Beskudnikovskiy Blvd., bld. 24/1, apartment 210, Moscow, Russian Federation
- Area served: Worldwide
- Key people: Valerya Udalova (CEO); Danila Medvedev (Chairman)
- Revenue: ₽8,000,000 (2013)
- Net income: 199,000 (2018)
- Members: 11
- Number of employees: 0 (2017)
- Website: www.kriorus.ru/en

KrioRus (Russian: КриоРус) is the first cryonics company in Russia. It was founded in 2005 by the Russian Transhumanist Movement NGO. It is the only cryonic company in Europe to possess its own cryonic storage. The company offers the services of freezing the entire bodies or heads of clients in liquid nitrogen with a plan to revive them if such a technology is developed, but takes no legal obligations to do so.

== History ==
KrioRus was founded in 2005 by a group of nine people who wanted to be cryogenically frozen along with their relatives, to be revived in the future. Some of the company's founders had prior experience in cryopreservation. For instance, in 2003, Igor ARyukhov was the chief advisor to the project that aimed to preserve the brain of a deceased biotechnologist.

The company was established as a project run by the Russian Transhumanist Movement NGO. The same year, Lydia Fedorenko became the company's first client, yet by then KrioRus had no cryogenic storage, and Fedorenko's relatives had to store her brain in solid CO₂. By the mid-2010s the company had clients from the United States, Netherlands, Japan, Israel, Italy, Switzerland and Australia. Several relatives of KrioRus employees were put in cryogenic storage as well.

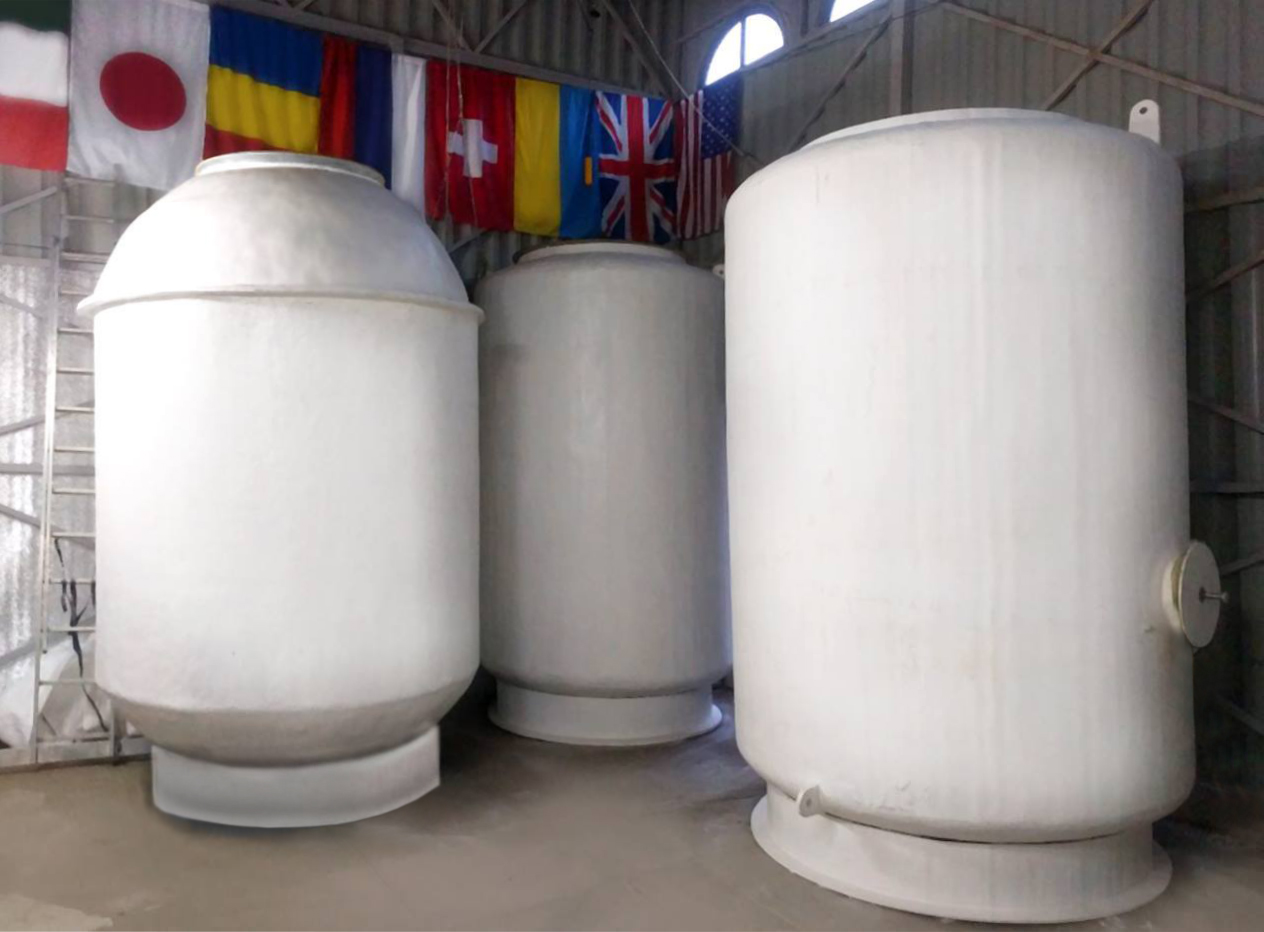
Kriorus cryostorage

KrioRus first cryogenic storage facility was constructed in 2006 in Alabushevo, Solnechnogorsky District, Moscow Oblast. The second storage facility was launched in Sergiyevo-Posadsky District of Moscow Oblast in 2012. By 2016, the company planned to build another cryogenic storage near Tver and establish an R&D facility there.

According to KrioRus and press reports, as of August 15, 2019 the company has 70 people under care (36 bodies and 34 patients' heads), 10 dogs, 17 cats, both male and female, as well as four birds and a chinchilla. In addition, there are human and animal DNA samples in storage. Almost as many as 200 Russian citizens have entered into cryopreservation agreements with the company. KrioRus is considered to be one of the largest cryonics companies in the world competing with Alcor Life Extension Foundation (170 people in cryogenic storage) and some others. In addition, KrioRus is the first cryocompany in Europe that possesses its own cryogenic storage facility.

The company has participated in some medical technology and funeral homes business exhibition in Russia and abroad, namely the Health Industry-2012(Russian: Индустрия здравоохранения-2012), Necropolis (Russian: Некрополь) (2013, 2014, 2015, and 2016), Necropolis-Siberia (2016), TanExpo (2016). At 2013 Necropolis exhibition, the company received the gold medal for innovations.

== Top management and staff ==
Since 2009, Valeria Udalova is the current CEO of KrioRus. The former Danila Medvedev is the chairman of the board of directors and a deputy CEO for strategic development. Director for Science is the biophysicist, Igor Artyukhov. Since 2016, there are 11 people listed as company founders including Valeria Udalova, Danila Medvedev, and Igor Artyukov. The R&D team is led by cryobiologist Yuri Pichugin, PhD, who previously worked in Cryonics Institute (USA, Detroit) from 2001 to 2007.

== Activities ==
KrioRus provides various services related to preservation of human and animal bodies and brains in liquid nitrogen. (Note: Service, that is provided by KrioRus is called "deep freezing of human and animal bodies".) The company admits that the technology that would allow to "resurrect" cryogenically frozen people doesn't yet exist, and the success of the procedure depends entirely on the technological advancements in cryonics. The additional services include safekeeping of personal archives to help restore the clients' identities in the future.

The company is incorporated in Russia and operates in a relatively new, unregulated field, enabling it to provide services at lower cost than its US-based rivals. It also plans to expand to countries such as Switzerland where euthanasia is legal, thus allowing for a more simple cryogenic conservation process. KrioRus R&F facilities are located in Moscow and in Voronezh and work on improving of frosting and defrosting methods and technologies. The company collaborates with the Russian Foundation for Advanced Studies and other cryonics companies in the field of reversible organ deep-freeze technologies.

== Legal aspects ==
Legally speaking, the contract between KrioRus and its clients is structured as an agreement to participate in a scientific experiment; hence, the customers must accept the risks associated with it and acknowledge that the "revival" is not guaranteed. The contract covers the preservation of the bodies for up to 100 years. As KrioRus has a legal status of a scientific institution, its activities are not subject to certification.

== Price list ==
In 2018, body freezing cost $36,000, head or brain freezing cost $15,000 for Russians and $18,000 for foreigners. The fee already includes the cryopreservation procedure and body storage.

== Criticism ==
Yevgeny Alexandrov, the chair of the Russian Academy of Sciences commission against pseudoscience, has said that there is no scientific basis for cryonics and that the company's offering is based on unfounded speculations.

== See also ==
- Alcor Life Extension Foundation
- American Cryonics Society
- Cryonics Institute
- Shandong Yinfeng Life Science Research Institute
