= Faloon =

Faloon is a surname. Notable people with the surname include:

- William “Bill” Faloon (born 1954), founder of the Life Extension Foundation
- Brian Faloon (born 1958), Northern Irish musician
- Steve Faloon (born 1958), famous memory research subject under K. Anders Ericsson
- William Faloon (born 1954), an author and life extensionist
- Willie Faloon (born 1986), Northern Irish rugby union player

== See also ==
- Granfalloon, a fictional concept
