= Thomas K. Donaldson =

American mathematician and cryonics advocate (1945–2006)

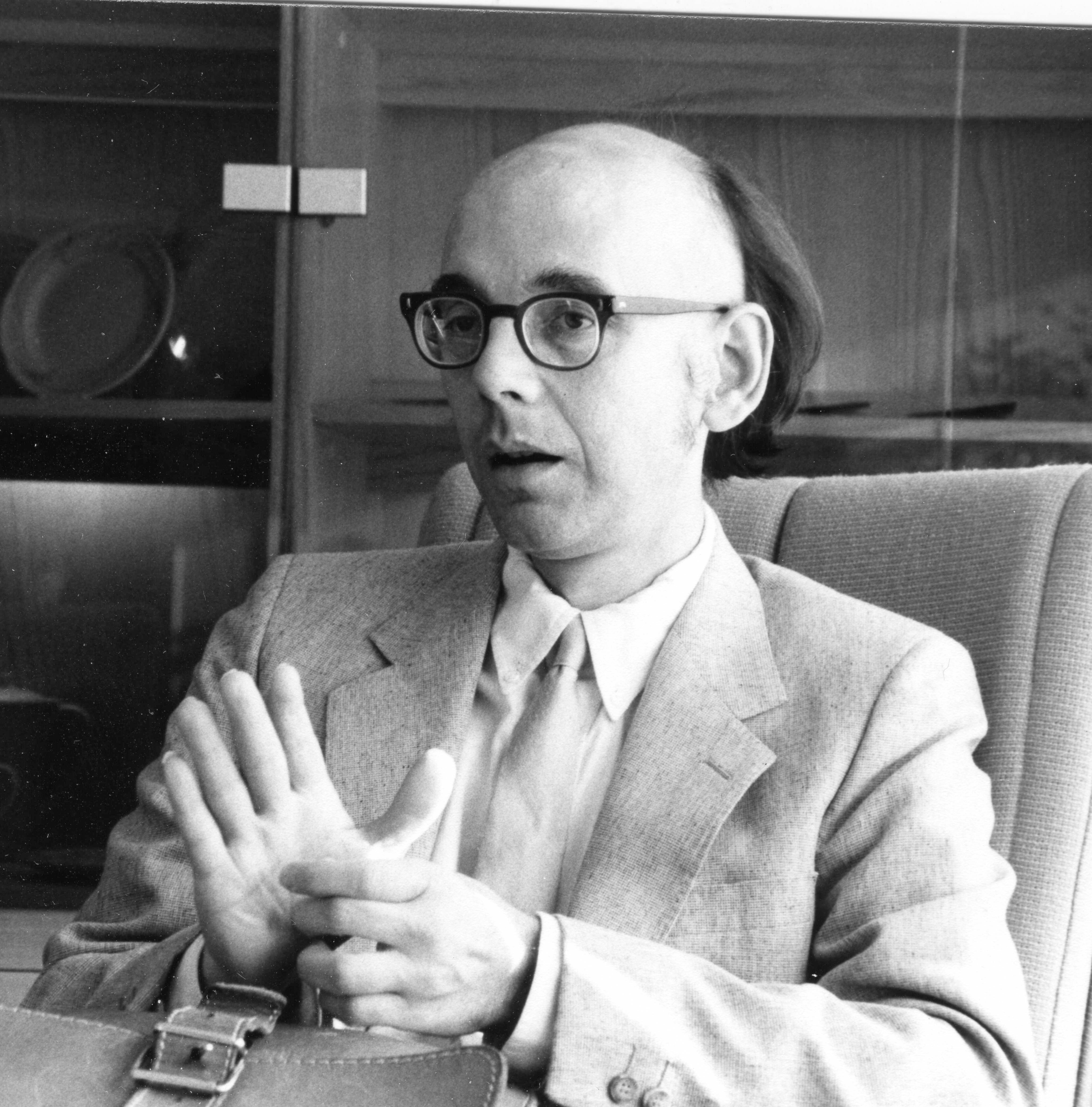
- Donaldson on 27 October 1990 in London
- Born: 1944; Kentucky, U.S.
- Died: 2006 (aged 61–62); Scottsdale, Arizona, U.S.
- Education: University of Chicago (Ph.D.)
- Spouse: Catherine Woof
- Scientific career
- Thesis: Embedding theorems for Orlicz-Sobolev spaces and applications
- Doctoral advisor: Felix Browder

Thomas K. Donaldson (1944 – 2006) was a mathematician and well-known cryonics advocate. He was born in the state of Kentucky in the United States, and took his Ph.D. from the University of Chicago in 1969. He also lived in Sunnyvale, California, and for many years in Canberra, Australia, where he taught mathematics at Australian National University. He founded both the Cryonics Association of Australia and the Institute for Neural Cryobiology, which has funded ground-breaking research in cryopreservation of brain tissue.

== Writings ==
In 1974 his monograph A Laplace Transform Calculus for Partial Differential Operators was published by the American Mathematical Society.

In 1976 Donaldson published A Brief Scientific Introduction to Cryonics, the first concise review of scientific literature supporting the practice of cryonics. He was a regular contributor to Cryonics magazine, the newsletter of the Alcor Life Extension Foundation, for many years. He also published his own periodical, Periastron, which discussed neuroscience issues as they pertain to cryonics.

Donaldson proposed some of the earliest ideas for cell repair technologies, seeing such technologies as extensions of natural biology, but using new enzymes and solvents other than water for low temperature operation. When Eric Drexler’s ideas about molecular nanotechnology came to dominate cryonics thinking in the mid-1980s, he frequently expressed concern that too much reliance was being placed on the new molecular-mechanical repair paradigm to the exclusion of earlier biological approaches. Donaldson’s seminal exposition of his vision of future medicine was his 1988 essay, 24th Century Medicine.

== Definition of death ==
The views expressed by Donaldson on the subject of death were far reaching even by cryonics standards. According to Donaldson, as long as the brain continues to exist in some kind of repairable form, “death” was merely a label indicating that the memory and personality information within it were beyond reach of current technology. While all cryonics proponents would agree with that where today’s technology is concerned, Donaldson went further. Instead of expecting a plateau of “mature nanotechnology” to someday clearly answer whether cryopreserved patients are information theoretically dead, he suggested that increasingly sophisticated methods for decrypting the original information content of injured brains would always keep coming. He wrote of "neural archaeology" as an important part of future medicine. He said cryonics in some form would always be necessary because whether certain brain injuries were ultimately repairable would always remain an open question for the future.

Donaldson also maintained an avid interest in biomedical gerontology, self-publishing the book "A Guide to Anti-aging Drugs" in 1994. Despite this interest, he was pessimistic about near-term prospects for extension of human lifespan. In 1986 he stated that only small children might live long enough to see advances allowing them to avoid the need for cryonics. In late 2005, he wrote in Cryonics magazine, "We aim, by cryopreservation, to reach a time when aging can be reversed and abolished. Cryopreservation may well turn out to be the only way that anyone (now living) has any chance of doing that."

== Brain tumor ==
In 1988, Donaldson was diagnosed with grade II astrocytoma, a type of malignant brain tumor. Despite radiation therapy, his long-term prognosis was poor. In 1990 he received international attention when he unsuccessfully sued the Attorney General of the State of California for the right to an elective cryopreservation to prevent the tumor from destroying his brain. An episode of the television drama L.A. Law was based on his story. Although he was criticized for wanting to sacrifice life today for uncertain life in the future, the intent of his lawsuit was to obtain the right to cryopreservation should his tumor begin regrowing, not a desire for immediate cryopreservation.

In early 2006, his friend Steve Bridge posted a message to the Cryonet email list indicating that Donaldson’s cancer had returned, and that he was returning from Australia to the United States in serious condition. He is cryopreserved at the Alcor Life Extension Foundation; his biography matches the description of patient A-1097, described in the Spring 2006 issue Cryonics Magazine, who received an unusually smooth cryopreservation on January 19, 2006.
