= Dora Kent =

American subject of cryopreservation controversy (1904–1987)

- Born: May 1, 1904; New York, US
- Died: December 11, 1987 (aged 83); Riverside, California, US
- Known for: legal controversy around cryonic suspension

Dora Kent (May 1, 1904 – December 11, 1987) was the subject of a 1988 legal controversy about whether she had been murdered to facilitate her cryonic suspension. She was Alcor's eighth patient and the oldest at that time to ever be cryopreserved. She was the mother of Saul Kent, a board member of Alcor. In her earlier years, Kent worked as a dressmaker in New York City.

In December 1987, succumbing to Alzheimer's disease and pneumonia, Kent was brought by her son to the Alcor facility in Riverside, California, where she died. Alcor workers removed her head and stored it in a nitrogen-cooled Dewar flask. No physician was in attendance when she died.

The Riverside County coroner's office, led by Raymond Carrillo, autopsied Kent's headless body and determined the cause of death to be pneumonia. Later, the coroner said that the presence of certain metabolites in the body suggested that she was still alive at the time of preservation. Drugs, specifically barbiturates, were used as part of the cryonics process, and it was therefore difficult to tell whether a drug was administered before or after death. The coroner demanded the head for autopsy, along with all of Alcor's patient records and all its patients' bodies. When Alcor workers refused to produce her head or surrender other patients' bodies, several Alcor workers and volunteers, including Mike Darwin, were handcuffed and arrested, although none were charged.

In a SWAT team raid a week later, most of Alcor's property was seized, although it was later returned. Deputy coroner Dan Cupido said that Alcor had better equipment than some medical facilities. Alcor sued the county for false arrest and illegal seizure and won both suits, including a $90,000 settlement on behalf of the six workers who had been falsely arrested.

Ultimately, the court granted a restraining order against the coroner, protecting the head of Dora Kent and the other frozen human remains at Alcor from seizure, destruction or damage.

The case received much publicity over the ensuing years, which resulted in more interest in Alcor's services and sudden growth in the number of Alcor members. In 1988, the Alcor Life Extension Foundation had its BBS and other electronic equipment seized in a raid of their headquarters following the freezing of Dora Kent in December 1987. ALCOR sued the FBI, had the case dismissed, and then sued the County and City of Riverside, California for compensation. This case was settled for $30,000.
