= Robert Prehoda =

American chemist

- Born: July 7, 1931
- Died: June 11, 2009 (aged 77)
- Spouse: Aline
- Scientific career
- Fields: Chemistry

Robert Wayne Prehoda (July 7, 1931 – June 11, 2009) was an American chemist and futurist. He participated in the first cryonic suspension of a human being, that of James Bedford. He had a wife, Aline.

== Works ==
- What are the effects of current automation trends in the oil industry on management, unions and the employees?, University of Tulsa, 1957
- Technological forecasting methodology, 1966
- Designing the future: the role of technological forecasting, Chilton Book Co., 1967
- Extended youth: the promise of gerontology, Putnam, 1968
- Suspended animation: the research possibility that may allow man to conquer the limiting chains of time, Chilton Book Co., 1969
- Your Next Fifty Years, Penguin Group (USA) Incorporated, 1980 (ISBN 9780441952212)
