= Active component =

Active component may refer to:

- Active duty, full-time service in a military force
- Active component, an electronic device that amplifies a signal or produces a power gain

== See also ==
- Active Components, an electronic parts vendor formerly part of Future Electronics
- Active ingredient
