= Frozen Dead Guy Days =

Annual celebration in Nederland, Colorado, US

Coordinates: 39°57′42″N 105°30′39″W

- Frequency: Annual
- Locations: Nederland, Colorado, Estes Park, Colorado
- Inaugurated: 2002
- Website: frozendeadguydays.com

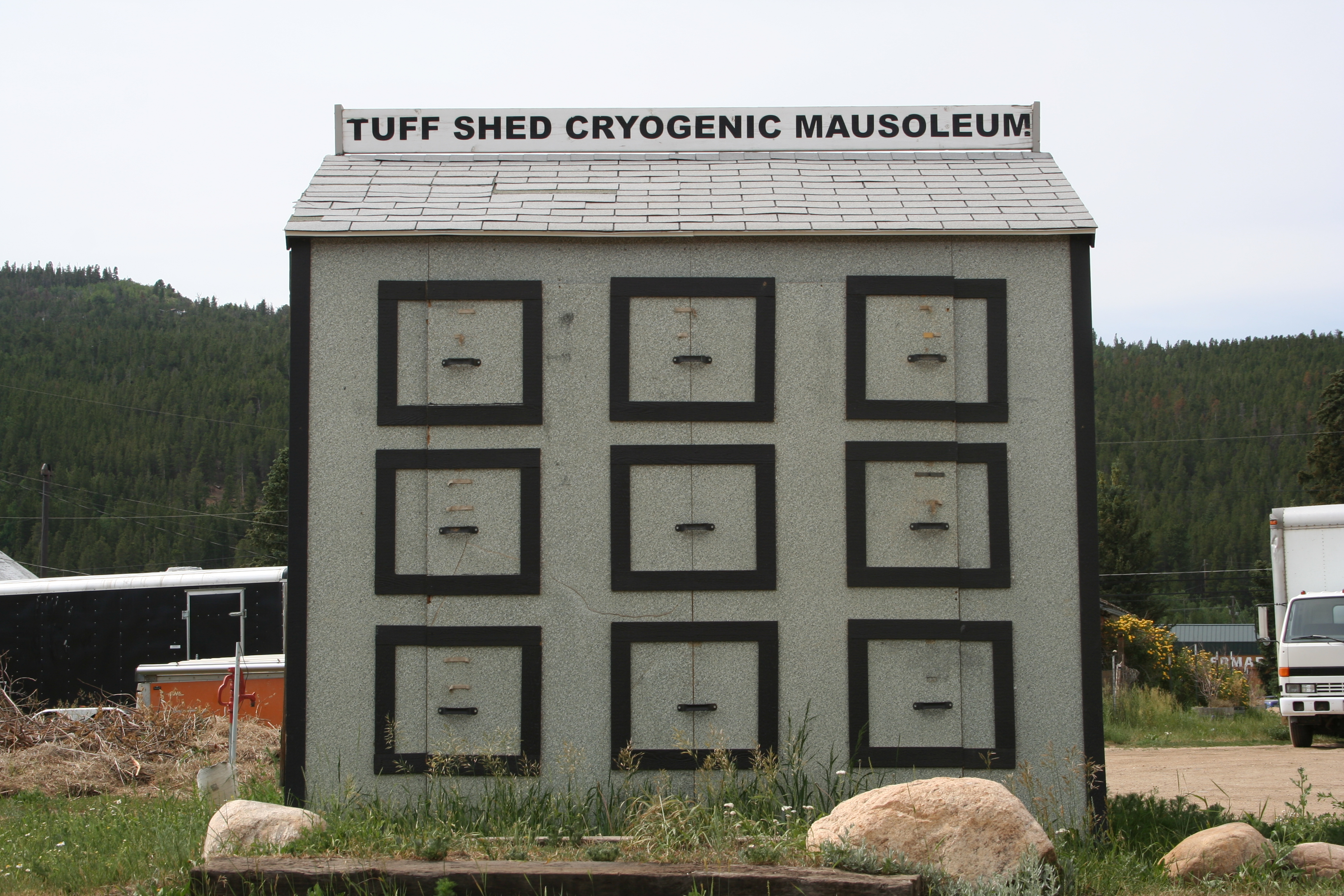
Tuff Shed from Frozen Dead Guy Days

Frozen Dead Guy Days is an annual celebration held in the town of Nederland, Colorado from 2002 until 2023 and afterward in Estes Park, Colorado, to loosely celebrate the cryopreservation of Bredo Morstøl (1900–1989).

== History ==
In 1989, a Norwegian citizen named Trygve Bauge brought the corpse of his recently deceased grandfather, Bredo Morstøl, to the United States. The body was preserved on dry ice for the trip, and stored in liquid nitrogen at the Trans Time cryonics facility in San Leandro, California from 1990 to 1993.

In 1993, Bredo was returned to dry ice and transported to the town of Nederland, where Trygve and his mother Aud planned to create a cryonics facility of their own. When Trygve was deported from the United States for overstaying his visa, his mother, Aud, continued keeping her father's body cryogenically frozen in a shack behind her unfinished house.

Aud was eventually evicted from her home for living in a house with no electricity or plumbing, in violation of local ordinances. At that time, she told a local reporter about her father's body and that of another individual whose partner had signed a cryonics contract with Trygve, and the reporter went to the local city hall in order to let them know about Aud's fears that her eviction would cause the bodies to thaw out. (The other body was eventually removed and cremated by the family.)

According to an article in the February 7, 1995, The Denver Post, Aud Morstøl was found guilty by a jury of building-use and zoning violations. The Nederland town judge ordered her to remove the frozen body of her father from Nederland by March 6 or face 10 days in jail and a $600.00 fine.

The story caused a sensation. In response, the city added a broad new provision to Section 7-34 of its Municipal Code, "Keeping of bodies", outlawing the keeping of "the whole or any part of the person, body or carcass of a human being or animal or other biological species which is not alive upon any property". However, because of the publicity that had arisen, they made an exception for Bredo, a grandfather clause. Trygve secured the services of Delta Tech, a local environmental company, to keep the cryonic facility running. Bo Shaffer, CEO of Delta Tech, was known locally as "The Iceman" and caretaker responsible for transporting the dry ice necessary for cryopreservation to the IC Institute, something he has done since 1995. In that year, the local Tuff Shed supplier and a Denver radio station built a new shed in which to store the body of Bredo. In the fall of 2012, Jane Curtis Gazit and Mike Wooten, took over as Bredo's caretakers, but they passed caretaking duties to Brad Wickham, a resident of Nederland, who is the current caretaker.

In honor of the town's unique resident, Nederland holds an annual celebration, first started in 2002.

In August 2023, Bredo's body was relocated to the Stanley Hotel. The Alcor Life Extension Foundation assisted with relocating the body from its prior home in the Nederland shed and setting up a new cryonic chamber in the ice house to contain the frozen corpse. The hotel named the ice house the "International Cryonics Museum" and offers paid tours to visit it.

== Annual celebration ==
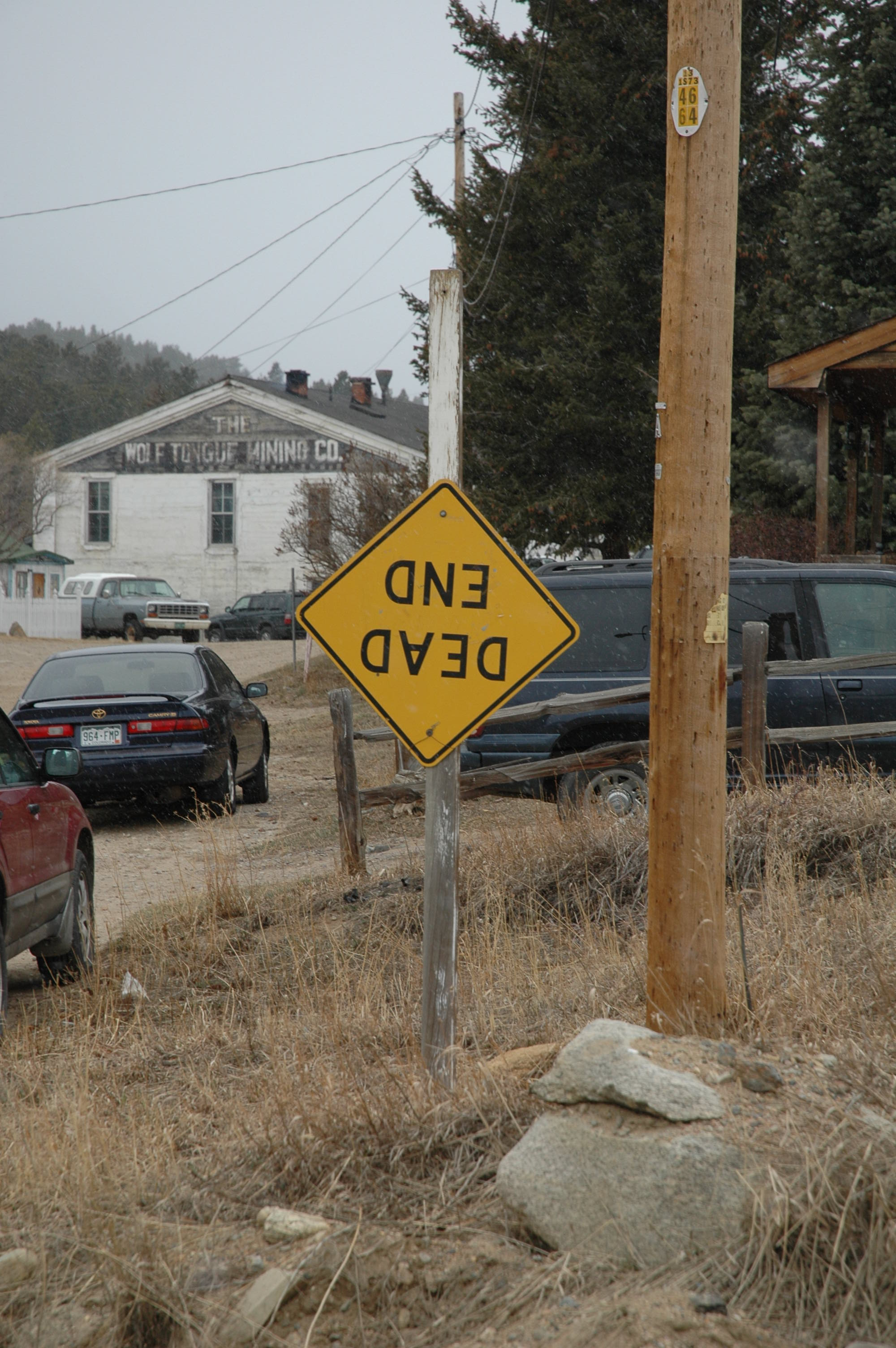
Signage alteration at Frozen Dead Guy Days

Frozen Dead Guy Days is typically celebrated on the second weekend of March. Coffin races, a hearse parade, and "Frozen Dead Guy" lookalike contests are held. A documentary on "Grandpa Bredo", called Grandpa's in the Tuff Shed, is shown. A newer version of the film, Grandpa's Still in the Tuff Shed, was premiered in Nederland on March 7, 2003.

Other events include a tour of the Tuff Shed where Grandpa is still frozen; a "polar plunge" for those brave enough to go swimming in Colorado in early March (which generally requires breaking through the ice); coffin races (a team of 7 members build a ‘coffin’ and race an obstacle course carrying a teammate in said coffin), a dance, called "Grandpa's Blue Ball"; pancake breakfasts; Poetry Slam; a market showcasing local artists; Snowy Human Foosball, Fix-A-Frozen-Flat and frozen t-shirt competitions, and snow sculpture contests. Glacier Ice Cream, headquartered in the nearby city of Boulder, makes a flavor specifically for the festival (named, appropriately enough, Frozen Dead Guy), consisting of fruit-flavored blue ice cream mixed with crushed Oreo cookies and sour gummy worms. Tours of the Tuff Shed where Grandpa is still frozen were suspended after 2005, after Grandpa's family "became frustrated with Frozen Dead Guy Days", but they resumed with the 2010 celebration.

There has been a growing increase in interest in the festival, with rising attendance numbers each year. The 2019 event had an estimated 25,000 visitors. Various fan films have documented the backstory of the festival. In March 2020, just days before the 19th annual weekend event, the festival was cancelled due to rising concerns about the risk of large crowds spreading the coronavirus pandemic, especially given the rising number of documented cases.

Although Trygve and Aud filed a complaint against Nederland involving money and naming rights in 2005, Frozen Dead Guy Days continued to be held annually. Long-time organizer Amanda MacDonald partially relinquished ownership and control of the event in 2019. The celebration was last held March 19–20, 2022 after a two year hiatus due to the coronavirus pandemic. Organizers announced the 2023 iteration would be cancelled, stating Nederland refuses "to work with the festival's current owners again." The festival moved to Estes Park in 2023 and, as of 2026, general admission tickets start at $55.
