= Larry Johnson (author) =

Larry Johnson (born in Albuquerque, New Mexico) is an American author and former employee of the Alcor Life Extension Foundation (Alcor), a cryonics company for whom he once served as a paramedic. He received notoriety with the release of the August 13, 2003 issue of Sports Illustrated. Sports Illustrated sportswriter Tom Verducci, along with Johnson's input, published an article about "What Really Happened to Ted Williams?" Immediately following the Sports Illustrated article, Johnson agreed to an interview with Diane Sawyer of Good Morning America.

Alcor has accused Johnson of engaging in profiteering and attempting to sensationalize his experiences at Alcor as a means of making money. In 2003, CNN correspondent Gary Tuchman noted: "Johnson certainly doesn't mind using his connections as an ex-employee to make a buck. Johnson has started a Web site, where for a so-called donation of at least $20, graphic photographs were displayed, photographs, he said, documenting the fate of Ted Williams. Johnson won't talk on camera about Ted Williams, but his attorney acknowledges Sports Illustrated was not told about his client's money making plans." During the fall of 2003, while Director of Clinical Services for Alcor, Johnson did an interview in Cryonics Magazine.

On September 28, 2003, an article was published in the Phoenix, Arizona newspaper East Valley Tribune with the headline "Scottsdale company's role in death probe." This article reports that Larry Johnson speaks of a 1992 death of a North Hollywood, California man whose remains are frozen at Alcor. According to Johnson he has audio taped evidence that personally recorded, of an Alcor employee who may have hastened the death of one of their members. Johnson later stated that the police were not interested in pursuing an investigation. The nurse who pronounced the 1992 death has denied Johnson's claim that there was any hastening of death. The nurse's description of the events surrounding that death contradict Alcor's published case report. The nurse claims his patient died in the bedroom, while Alcor's case report and Larry Johnson's version of the story agree the patient died in a "makeshift operating room" in the garage. In October 2009, "Alcor's CEO at the time, (1992) Carlos Mondragon, told ABC News that the allegation that the patient's death was hastened was brought directly to him, and that his response was to cut Alcor's ties with the employee accused of administering the injection."

During the Fall of 2009, Johnson released a book called, FROZEN: My Journey into the World of Cryonics, Deception, and Death. This book has received heavy criticism from those working in the field of cryonics.

== Alcor litigation ==
Mr. Johnson retracted no specific allegations about Alcor in his statement associated with a legal settlement over his book. No judge, nor jury, has ruled on the veracity of the contents of the book. The NY court has ruled against Alcor's claims of conversion and exposure of trade secrets, and in May 2014, the case was dismissed in favor of the publisher and authors in New York Supreme Court.

== See also ==
- Cryonics
