= Immortalist Society =

US nonprofit organization

- Founded: June 27, 1967; 59 years ago
- Founder: Robert Ettinger and others
- Registration no.: 501(c)(3)
- Purpose: Research & education in the areas of cryonics & life extension.
- Location: 24355 Sorrentino Court, Charter Township of Clinton, Michigan 48035
- Coordinates: 42°33′18.7″N 82°51′59.83″W
- Origins: US
- Region served: Cryonics & Researches
- Product: Long Life Magazine
- Key people: Stephan Beauregard, Royce Brown, Debbie Fleming, Richard Medalie & York Porter.
- Volunteers: 5
- Website: immortalistsociety.org
- Formerly called: Cryonics Society of Michigan, Cryonics Association

The Immortalist Society is a charitable 501(c)(3) organization devoted to research and education in the areas of cryonics and life extension. It was incorporated as a Michigan corporation by Robert Ettinger and five other local residents on June 27, 1967, as the Cryonics Society of Michigan, Inc.. In September 1976, the name of the corporation was changed to Cryonics Association in acknowledgement that its scope of operations was not limited to a single state. On October 20, 1985, the Articles of Incorporation were amended once more to change the name to Immortalist Society.

== Operation ==
The Immortalist Society is particularly supportive of the work of the Cryonics Institute. Donations to the Immortalist Society Research Fund were given to finance the research of Dr. Yuri Pichugin, the full-time Russian cryobiologist employed by the Cryonics Institute to develop vitrification mixture, improve perfusion protocol and find formulations to minimize cold ischemia (a concern for organ transplantation). Dr. Pichugin resigned from the Cryonics Institute in December 2007.

== See also ==
- Immortality
