= Saul Kent =

American life extension activist (1939–2023)

Saul Kent (July 18, 1939 – c. May 26, 2023) was a life extension activist, and co-founder of the Life Extension Foundation, a dietary supplement vendor and promoter of anti-aging research. He was also a pioneer in the practice of cryonics, and was a board member of the cryonics organization Alcor Life Extension Foundation.

== Career ==
=== Cryonics ===
Kent became a cryonics activist while a college student, upon hearing Robert Ettinger on a radio show appearance and subsequently reading Ettinger's book The Prospect of Immortality shortly after it was published in 1964.

Kent was cryopreserved by Alcor in May 2023.

==== Cryopreservation of mother ====
In 1988, Saul Kent made national headlines, because he brought his mother, Dora Kent, to the Alcor Life Extension Foundation, a California cryopreservation facility, where she died and her head was cryopreserved. The authorities were unable to locate her head for autopsy.

=== Life Extension Foundation ===
In 1977 he established the Florida Cryonics Association as a public charity with the stated purpose of promoting cryobiology research. In 1980, Kent started the Life Extension Foundation along with William Faloon, a membership organization that claims to inform people about the latest advances in the life extension sciences, sell dietary supplements, and fund life extension research by offering grants to scientists in universities and by supporting startup biotech companies.

=== Timeship ===
Kent and Faloon were involved in a project called Timeship, which involves building a facility designed by an architect Stephen Valentine (starting from 1997) to house companies conducting research in the life extension and reanimation sciences and provide long-term care for cryopreserved humans. The Timeship Project, when built, will be located at the Stasis Foundation Biotechnology Research Park, in Comfort, Texas, on a 646-acre property formerly known as the Bildarth Estate.
