= William Faloon =

American author and immortalist (b. 1954)

William "Bill" Faloon (born 1954) is an author, life extensionist, and co-founder of the Life Extension Foundation, the Church of Perpetual Life, and the FDA Holocaust Museum.

== Early life ==
Faloon was born to a Presbyterian family and at age 8, was told by his mother that everyone eventually dies, an idea he refused to believe, sparking his interest in human immortality. At age 13, a local newspaper article about Robert Ettinger aroused his interest in the prospect of cryonics. After learning of Alcor Life Extension Foundation, at age 15, Faloon decided to take a life insurance policy out on himself, naming his mother as the beneficiary so that if he died, she could use those funds to cryonically preserve him. Faloon pursued his higher education at the Pittsburgh Institute of Mortuary Science, completing a one-year mortuary science program, in hopes of being able to cryopreserve others. A few years later, around 1974, he moved to South Florida to assist in the setup of Neptune Society.

== Career ==
In 1977, Faloon and Saul Kent co-founded the Florida Cryonics Association (to become Life Extension Foundation in 2000) as a way to promote cryopreservation research. In 1980, the organization transformed into not only funding research and promoting their cause through a monthly newsletter, but also selling and manufacturing supplements after receiving $100,000 from Stephen Ruddel, a real estate tycoon. After Faloon's appearance on Merv Griffin's show in 1982, his popularity, and that of his company, rose exponentially.

As the success of his business rose, so did the attention of the local Hollywood police and in 1986, the SWAT team raided Ruddel's office, where cocaine was found and Ruddel pled guilty to drug-possession charges. This did not deter Faloon or Kent, who continued selling nutritional supplements through their warehouse, and on February 26, 1987, the FDA raided Life Extension's office and warehouse, seizing all of their supplements, claiming that the company was selling unapproved drugs to consumers. On November 7, 1991, another raid, this time on Life Extension's Arizona facility, landed both Faloon and Kent in jail (they turned themselves in at a courthouse in Ft. Lauderdale, Florida) on over two dozen counts of conspiring and importing unapproved drugs. They were both released the next day on an $825,000 bond each. In November 1995, Federal Judge Daniel Hurley dismissed all but one of the 56 criminal charges filed against Foundation officers Saul Kent and William Faloon. In February 1996, Judge Hurley dismissed the final charge. In 1994, Congress passed the DSHEA, which Life Extension Foundation was instrumental in getting passed, which provided ground rules for supplement companies, which gave Faloon the ability to expand Life Extension.

== Bibliography ==
- Disease Prevention and Treatment: Scientific Protocols That Integrate Mainstream and Alternative Medicine (2000) (Co-authored with Life Extension Foundation)
- Doctor Tandy's First Guide to Life Extension and Transhumanity (2001) (Contributor)
- Pharmocracy: How Corrupt Deals and Misguided Medical Regulations are Bankrupting America-- and what to Do about it (2011)
- Pharmocracy II: How Corrupt Deals and Misguided Medical Regulations are Bankrupting America-- and what to Do about it (2017)
