= Jerry Leaf =

American businessman

- Born: Jerry Donnell Leaf; April 4, 1941
- Died: July 10, 1991 (aged 50)
- Occupation: Cryonics

Jerry Donnell Leaf (April 4, 1941 – July 10, 1991) was Vice President and Director of the cryonics organization Alcor Life Extension Foundation, and President of the cryonics service firm Cryovita, Inc. until his death in 1991.

Leaf joined the United States Army and fought in special operations during the Vietnam War. Upon return, he received a bachelor's degree in philosophy from Cerritos College. He also worked as a cardiothoracic surgery researcher at the UCLA School of Medicine, co-authoring more than 20 papers from the laboratory of Dr. Gerald Buckberg.

During the late 1970s and 1980s, Leaf transformed the field of cryonics by bringing unprecedented medical expertise to the field and introducing technologies and procedures of thoracic surgery, especially heart-lung bypass, for improved blood vessel access and life support of cryonics patients. Leaf was involved in the first experiments done by a cryonics organization.

He is most famous for developing with Mike Darwin a blood substitute shown capable of sustaining life in dogs for four hours at near-freezing temperatures. Leaf was the head of Alcor's suspension team and participated in many suspensions of Alcor patients.

== Cryovita Laboratories ==
In 1978, after teaching surgery as a research associate at UCLA, Leaf founded Cryovita Laboratories. Cryovita was a for-profit organization which provided cryopreservation services and the building for Alcor in the 1980s, including storage of the first cryonics patient, James Bedford, from 1982. During this time, Leaf also collaborated with Michael Darwin in a series of hypothermia experiments in which dogs were resuscitated with no measurable neurological deficit after hours in deep hypothermia, just a few degrees above zero Celsius. The blood substitute which was developed for these experiments became the basis for the washout solution used at Alcor. Together, Leaf and Darwin developed a standby-transport model for human cryonics cases with the goal of intervening immediately after cardiac arrest and minimizing ischemic injury, the "gold standard" of technology at that time, in which a patient's kidney was considered to be in transplantable condition two days after his or her death.

Leaf and Darwin transferred Bedford, the first person cryopreserved, to a more technologically advanced Cryogenic storage dewar at Alcor in 1991, and were able to examine him at that time. A member of the Society for Cryobiology, Leaf objected to a 1980s change by the Society to amend its bylaws to prevent cryonicists from holding membership in the Society.

== Death ==
With no history of heart disease, Leaf suffered a fatal heart attack in 1991. He was subsequently cryopreserved by Alcor.
