= Brian Wowk =

Cryobiologist

Brian G. Wowk is a Canadian medical physicist and cryobiologist known for the discovery and development of synthetic molecules that mimic the activity of natural antifreeze proteins in cryopreservation applications, sometimes called "ice blockers". As a senior scientist at 21st Century Medicine, Inc., he was a co-developer with Greg Fahy of key technologies enabling cryopreservation of large and complex tissues, including the first successful vitrification and transplantation of a mammalian organ (kidney). Wowk is also known for early theoretical work on future applications of molecular nanotechnology, especially cryonics, nanomedicine, and optics. In the early 1990s he wrote that nanotechnology would revolutionize optics, making possible virtual reality display systems optically indistinguishable from real scenery as in the fictitious Holodeck of Star Trek. These systems were described by Wowk in the chapter "Phased Array Optics" in the 1996 anthology Nanotechnology: Molecular Speculations on Global Abundance, and highlighted in the September 1998 Technology Watch section of Popular Mechanics magazine.

== Early life and education ==
He obtained his undergraduate and graduate degrees from the University of Manitoba in Winnipeg, Canada. Dr. Wowk obtained his PhD in physics in 1997. His graduate studies included work in online portal imaging for radiotherapy at the Manitoba Cancer Treatment and Research Foundation (now Cancer Care Manitoba), and work on artifact reduction for functional magnetic resonance imaging at the National Research Council of Canada. His work in the latter field is cited by several text books, including Functional MRI which includes an image he obtained of magnetic field changes inside the human body caused by respiration.

== Notes ==
- 1. Nanotechnology: Molecular Speculations on Global Abundance
- 2. Functional MRI
