= Robert Miller (Canadian businessman) =

Canadian businessman and billionaire (born 1943)

- Born: Robert Gerald Miller; July 1943 (age 83); Montreal, Quebec, Canada
- Citizenship: Canadian
- Education: Rider University, Montreal Technical Institute
- Occupations: Owner and founder of Future Electronics
- Years active: 1967-present
- Children: 2

Robert Gerald Miller is a Canadian billionaire businessman who founded Future Electronics in 1968, and built it into the world's third-largest electronics distributor controlling "most of the world's semiconductor and capacitor markets".

In February 2023, he stepped down as the company's president and chief executive officer following allegations by at least 40 women of setting up a system involving child sex trafficking girls as young as 11 years old, from 1977-2016.

Miller is also a supporter of the Alcor Life Extension Foundation and cryonics research, and he intends to be cryopreserved himself and has set aside a part of his fortune in his trust for his resurrected self to claim in the far future.

== Personal life ==
Miller claims to have come from "sparse beginnings" with his father David Miller having owned an antique store, sold cars, retail groceries and other careers. His father David had pled guilty in 1946 to keeping books for illegal gambling alongside boxing promoter Gaston Pelletier, and was arrested alongside and repeatedly named as an associate of mobster Harry Ship who was under the Cotroni crime family. In 1973, his father David Miller was named as a "mafia boss" in Montreal, alongside William Obront, Frank D'Asti, Nicholas Diorio, Vincent Soccio and David Laff. On February 7, 1973, David Miller was among 60 mobsters subpaeoned within a matter of hours, along with his elder son Alfred Norman Miller.

Miller worked at a snackbar and as a DJ to pay for college. As of 2010, he continued to serve as Master of Ceremonies in annual rock concerts for his employees, with headliners including Bryan Adams and Peter Cetera. When his corporate hockey team was struggling, he convinced NHL veterans Stephane Matteau and Donald Audette to come play for a tournament.

Miller is a graduate of Rider University. In 1967, Robert Miller was arrested alongside his father running an illegal gambling outfit in Calgary, Alberta just days before Robert's wedding; they paid $10,000 in bail and flew to Montreal for the wedding.

On Dec 3 1967, Miller married Margaret Josephine Antonier, an advertising executive at the Montreal radio stations CJAD and CJFM and real estate developer. In March 1969, Miller's hunting lease at Mansfield-et-Pontefract lapsed. Miller and Antonier had two sons, Frederick and Rodney. and lived in Montreal, Québec.

Settling into Montreal's Jewish community, Miller acquired his Westmount home from Seagram co-chair Charles Bronfman in 1984 for $2.65 million in what was at the time the second most expensive sale of a residence in Canada. The house was designed by architect Richard Weinstein, and featured an indoor/outdoor pool, a climate-controlled furs storage unit, auxiliary generator and wine cellar.

In 1984, Miller erected a $100,000 16' satellite dish in his new garden, leading his neighbours George and Ginger Petty to file for an injunction alleging it was "more fitting for a military base than residential Westmount", and it was held to not be legal. Miller relented and installed a 10' satellite dish in 1986, which a neighbour testified looked "like a strategic military air command base on full-alert." In 1989, he then erected a 32' "accessory building" on his property housing the larger 16' satellite dish and returned to Court as the Pettys filed again. Miller's legal team included Gordon Kugler of Kandestin Kugler, Bill Brock and Guy Laverge from Phillips and Vineberg and Stephen Segal lawyer from Future Electronics.

Miller does not allow his photo to be taken, and has asked for no voice recordings, citing security and a desire for privacy. His house is blurred on Google Maps, and his two private jets have their flightpaths removed from public view.

In 1995, Miller purchased the abandoned 12-storey Roche facility, once hoped to bring pharmaceutical industry to Vaudreuil-Dorion. Several floors were used by Future Electronics until 2008.

In 2004, Miller was diagnosed with atrial fibrillation, and subsequently received cryoablation, after consulting with Mario Lemieux about how to obtain it. Miller and Antonier separated in 2005 and divorced in 2006, with both accusing the other of infidelity - Antonier with a rival corporate leader and Miller with underage girls.

In 2007, he claimed more than half the profits of Future Technologies were given away as charity. He cares about "pollution, environmental degradation and the exploitation of finite resources". He has paid for three housing projects for the homeless in the Philippines, and contributed to disaster relief in Haiti, China and Japan.

He notes a very close relationship, transcending business, with the Polish-Jew Felix Zandman who also ran an electionics company.

He is noted to have been generous with employees and their children, and to have "helped in the development" of professional tennis player Greg Rusedski and NHL forward Martin Lapointe in addition to mentoring "prominent politicians, academics and business people around the world", and "cultivating friendships with politicians".

== Cryonics ==
In 2001, Miller's donations to secure cryonics services from Alcor triggered a regulatory crisis as Arizona did not permit Alcor to obtain more than a certain percentage of its total funding from a single individual donor as Miller had done.

In 2022, he registered the "Future Cryonics Foundation" in the United States to fund Alcor and when the child prostitution allegations resurfaced early in 2023 he increased funding from 4.5 million to approximately 35 million dollars.

== Future Electronics ==
Miller intended to work in radio after graduation, but was hired by Specialty Electronics wholesaler Ben Manis upon his 1967 return to Montreal and within 18 months had struck out with the owner's son Eli Manis to form Future Electronics. He bought out Manis' share in the company for $500,000 in 1976, and considers both Manis men to have been "unsophisticated" and unhelpful to his success. Miller attended a 3-year program at Montreal Technical Institute on electronics.

Some former employees have described a "cultish" atmosphere at Future Electronics, where Miller's "very aggressive and authoritarian" role at work and in their private family lives is obsequious and cards of his greatest quotes are given to new hires, and his business philosophy is a regulated mantra, although conceding there is rapid career advancement for those who buy into the program. A Quebec business journal had labeled Future Electronics the province's "most secretive company". He advises all his employees to sleep eight hours, avoid sugar, red meat, fried foods, starches and alcohol, exercise daily and vacation regularly.

The company was raided by the U.S. FBI and the RCMP in 1999. A total of 45 officers from both countries spent 24 hours inside the headquarters seizing "computers, computer tapes, discs, and 85 boxes of documents" later named only as 75 boxes of documents of evidence. Miller told employees that the raid was "an unfounded assault upon our integrity". The company both challenged the raid and the surrender of documents to authorities.

While Future Electronics released statements that the investigation was based on allegations of price-fixing that defrauded US companies, the FBI declined to clarify the nature of their investigation and stated "We wouldn't confirm that this is the direction the investigation is headed. Future, of course, is welcome to say what they want, but what people tell us is confidential." Future Electronics took the matter to court, to prevent any further details on the nature of the investigation from being released and to block the release of documents outlining the cause of the May 7 raid. The FBI and U.S. Attorney's Office announced in 2002 that they would not pursue charges.

During Miller's illness, his personal friend Gerry Duggan took over as president of the company before returning it to him on Oct 1 2005.

Following high-profile accusations of child sex trafficking, Miller stepped down as CEO and sold the company to Taiwan's WT Microelectronics for $3.8 billion ($5 billion Canadian).

== Allegations of sexual assault and arrest ==
In 2006, his wife Margaret Antonier filed for divorce claiming she had been shocked to discover horrendous evidence of child sexual abuse. Miller counter-filed claiming she'd had an affair with a colleague after they separated and successfully won a motion to seal the contents of his wife's allegations against him due to their "offensive" nature.

Antonier hired a private investigator to investigate Miller's alleged child rapes. He staked out the second Westmount house Miller had purchased, and recorded many young girls coming and going - before two of Miller's security team, which operated under the name "National Criminal Investigation Service"(NCIS) from Future Electronics headquarters, approached him and allegedly offered him $300,000 to turn over all his evidence and end the investigation.

In 2009, the Montreal police began an investigation into Miller's alleged involvement in child sex trafficking, and interviewed at least 10 alleged victims as well as carrying out another search warrant on the Future Electronics headquarters, alternatively described as targeting the "NCIS" within - although the warrant remains sealed. The Intercontinental Hotel confirmed that Miller kept a year-round lease on a room through the late 1990s in which he never overnighted, but would bring "very young ladies" for a few hours -and Miller paid to install a custom large bathing area their former head of security, interviewed by police, dubbed "the fuck tub". The investigation was closed down in 2010.

Miller has maintained his innocence, pointing out the age of consent was 14 and allegations of criminally paying for sex were concocted by his ex-wife. He also maintains that he has been sexually impotent for decades due to Parkinsons.

In February 2023 CBC investigative programs Enquête and The Fifth Estate ran programs noting Miller had been investigated several times for having repeatedly paid minors for sex. Miller stepped down from Future Electronics within hours of the program, while denying the allegations.

Miller was arrested on May 30, 2024 and faced 21 charges, later increased to 24 charges, including sexual assault, obtaining sexual services for consideration and several counts of sexual exploitation of minors. Miller was alleged to have used the alias "Bob Adams", claiming to be the president of "Audiophile Productions" in Chicago, while his assistant Raymond Poulet was alleged to have called himself Sebastien Tremblay, president of a fictional "California Productions Inc". He pleaded not guilty and denied the allegations.

On June 10, 2025, Miller was found to be unfit to stand trial in the Criminal Court due to late-stage Parkinson's disease causing cognitive decline.

As of late 2025, the 2023 civil class action lawsuit against Miller by alleged victims was continuing, and named three employees, Helmut Lippmann, Sam Joseph Abrams and Raymond Poulet, as engaging or facilitating the child sex acts, termed as grooming them with cash and gifts before arranging sex acts with an adult. Lippman had also been a target in the 1999 FBI and RCMP raid.

There are three additional lawsuits, outside the class-action, maintaining sexual molestation occurred at Miller's home, another Westmount residential property, and Montreal hotels including the Queen Elizabeth Hotel - and was facilitated by a female assistant of Miller who recruited young girls. In June 2024, Teresita Fuentes was arrested and charged in the investigation; she resides at the same address as Poulet who was arrested and charged in July 2025. In August 2025, charges were dropped against Fuentes.
