= Biomedical Research & Longevity Society =

Dietary supplement company

- Formerly: Life Extension Foundation
- Type: Private
- Industry: Health
- Founded: 1980; 46 years ago
- Founder: Saul Kent and William Faloon
- Headquarters: Fort Lauderdale, Florida, United States
- Products: Two-Per-Day Multivitamin; NAD+ Cell Regenerator (Nicotinamide Riboside); Neuro-Mag Magnesium L-Threonate
- Number of employees: 2 (2023)
- Website: www.brlsociety.org

The Biomedical Research & Longevity Society, formerly the Life Extension Foundation (LEF), is a company founded in 1980 to extend the healthy human lifespan by discovering methods to control aging and eradicate disease. Along with the Life Extension Buyer's Club, which sells vitamins and supplements, the Life Extension Foundation (LEF) was headquartered in Fort Lauderdale, Florida. It also has a call center location in Las Vegas, Nevada. The company changed its name in 2018 to Biomedical Research & Longevity Society.

== Activities ==
Along with the Life Extension Buyer's Club, the Life Extension Foundation (LEF) was headquartered in Fort Lauderdale, Florida. The Life Extension Foundation (LEF) was primarily funded by the sale of nutritional supplements to members of an affiliated entity, the Life Extension Buyer's Club. The Life Extension Buyer's Club was incorporated in Nevada, and has a separate EIN employer number than the Life Extension Foundation. Its name was changed to the Biomedical Research & Longevity Society in 2018.

In 1981 LEF recommended DHEA, in 1983 it recommended low-dose aspirin, and also in 1983 was the first organization in the United States to recommend coenzyme Q10 (CoQ10). In 1992 it introduced melatonin into its product line.

== History ==
The Biomedical Research & Longevity Society, which was originally named Life Extension Foundation (LEF), was founded by Saul Kent and William Faloon in 1980.

In 1987, the FDA raided the Life Extension Foundation's warehouse, and charged Kent and Faloon with 27 counts, including distributing unapproved drugs. 11 years later, all, by then, 56 FDA charges were dismissed by a federal judge. In 1994, Kent and Faloon opened the FDA Holocaust Museum to highlight millions of deaths they felt were caused by the FDA withholding or delaying approval of life-saving drugs and treatments.

In a 2009 tax filing, the company declared assets of over $25 million and netted more than $3 million on revenue of more than $18 million that year.

In May 2013, the Internal Revenue Service revoked the Life Extension Foundations tax-exempt status, retroactive to 2006. Forbes reported that "The IRS' problem with the Foundation is [...] an entirely worldly one: it asserts the membership organization's operations seem to be too entwined with the for-profit Life Extension Buyers Club." On August 7, 2013, LEF filed a Complaint for Declaratory Judgment in U.S. District Court for the District of Columbia challenging the IRS' allegations.

In 2018, foundation's tax-exempt status was reinstated retroactive to the date it was revoked, May 2013. The Life Extension Foundation also changed its name the same year, becoming the Biomedical Research and Longevity Society, Inc., or BRLS.

== See also ==
- Health freedom movement
- Alcor Life Extension Foundation
