= Cells4Life =

Stem cell bank

Cells4Life Group LLP
- Industry: Cord blood bank
- Founded: 2002
- Headquarters: Units 2-3 Oak House, Woodlands Office Park, Albert Drive, Burgess Hill, United Kingdom
- Number of locations: UK; Spain; Italy; Bulgaria; UAE
- Area served: Global
- Key people: Wayne Matthew Channon (Chairman); Dr Jeffrey Drew (CSO)
- Brands: TotiCyte
- Services: Umbilical stem cell preservation and research
- Number of employees: 30 (2015)
- Website: cells4life.com

Cells4Life is a private stem cell bank based in the United Kingdom. It procures, processes and stores human umbilical cord blood and tissue samples that may be used for stem cell treatments. Cells4Life is the largest provider of umbilical cord blood banking services in the UK, with over 50% of the UK market. Based in Burgess Hill, the company also provides umbilical stem cell storage and collection services in Spain, Italy, United Arab Emirates, Bulgaria, Pakistan and Kenya.

== History ==
Cells4Life was founded in 2002 by doctors and scientists to offer a stem cell storage and collection service in the United Kingdom. At the time, it was based in Falmer.

The firm was first licensed by Human Tissue Authority (HTA) in September 2006. It was licensed for the procurement, processing, testing, storage, distribution and import/export of human tissues and cells for human application, and storage of relevant material which has come from a human body for use for a scheduled purpose. By June 2015, the establishment was inspected by HTA on seven occasions. Cells4Life moved to its current premises in November 2010.

In 2014, Cells4Life became the first bank in the UK to provide cord tissue for patient therapy. It is the only UK private bank to have met the criteria for NetCord-FACT accreditation, which is held by most major public banks, including the NHS.

== Purpose and method ==
A child's umbilical cord blood and tissue is usually stored by parents when they believe their children might inherit a genetic disorder. Since stem cells can repair or replace almost any cell in the body, their storage may eliminate the need to search for a matching donor if the owner of the cells became ill. Stem cells could be used to treat over 80 illnesses and are currently being used on clinical trials for cerebral palsy, hearing loss, Alzheimer's disease, and more. There have been more than a million hematopoietic stem cell transplantations in the world as of December 2012.

Cells4Life advocates blood collection after the third stage of labour is complete. A phlebotomist, who was waiting in an adjacent room, drains the placenta and umbilical cord of the blood. To ensure that sample viability is maintained, the company uses a cool shipper for long distance shipments as the only cord blood bank providing such a service.

Once they are received into the company, samples (which must meet well-defined acceptance criteria) are processed in a dedicated clean area consisting of two biological safety cabinets within a soft wall clean room. For the processing and storage of samples, clients can choose between two services. For volume-reduced service, samples are additionally processed in a closed cell separation system designed to remove the plasma fraction. For the whole blood service, samples are stored without this processing step. In both cases, samples are held for long term, vapor-phase storage in dedicated liquid nitrogen tanks situated on-site and on licensed third party premises. Samples are stored across dual facilities for additional safety.

Cells4Life offers family and public banking. In family banking, families store their stem cells exclusively for the use of their child or a family member. The samples remain the family's responsibility and cannot be accessed by anyone else. In public banking, parents can donate their baby's cord blood to the public/community bank, to be used to save the life of someone requiring a stem cell transplant or in scientific research.

The firm has developed a technology, known as TotiCyte, which improves pre-freeze and post-thaw cell recovery, wasting fewer stem cells. By law, Cells4Life must keep records for 30 years after a client relationship ends.
