= Tuff Shed =

American company

Tuff Shed, Incorporated
- Type: Privately held company
- Founded: 1981
- Headquarters: Denver, Colorado
- Key people: Tom Saurey, Founder and CEO
- Revenue: 558 million USD (2022)
- Number of employees: 1,800
- Website: www.tuffshed.com

Tuff Shed Incorporated is a manufacturer and installer of storage buildings and garages in the United States. The company was founded in Rexburg, Idaho in 1981 by Tom Saurey. The company relocated its headquarters to Denver, Colorado in 1986.

== History ==
Tuff Shed Incorporated was founded by Tom Saurey in Rexburg, Idaho, in 1981.

In 1986, the company moved its headquarters to Denver, Colorado.

In June 2018, the company launched an Employee Stock Ownership Plan, becoming partially employee-owned. That same year, Sheds USA, based in New Hampshire, was acquired by the company.

== See also ==
- Shed
- Garage (house)
