= John Henry Williams (baseball) =

American businessman and baseball player

- First baseman
- Born: August 27, 1968; Brattleboro, Vermont, U.S.
- Died: March 6, 2004 (aged 35); Los Angeles, California, U.S.
- Batted: Right Threw: Right
- Stats at Baseball Reference

John Henry Dussault Williams (August 27, 1968 – March 6, 2004) was the only son of baseball player Ted Williams. His mother was Ted's third wife, Dolores Wettach.

== Background ==
Williams was born in August 1968 in Brattleboro, Vermont. His father named him "John-Henry" after the folk hero of the same name and his mother chose the middle name "Dussault" after Ding Dussault, a friend of the family and athletics coach at Tufts University.

Williams saw little of his father after his parents divorced in 1972. He attended Ted Williams baseball camp and would see his father at camp once a week during the summer. By all accounts, the relationship between Ted and Dolores remained chilly as their children grew. Dolores raised John Henry and his sister Claudia on a farm near Putney, Vermont.

He attended Vermont Academy, a small private college preparatory high school in Saxtons River, and graduated in 1986. He spent three semesters at Bates College before transferring to the University of Maine and earning a B.S. in marketing in 1991.

== Business ==
In 1992, during the height of the sports card boom, John Henry, along with Grand Slam Marketing, founded a sports card company called the Ted Williams Card Company. The company issued two baseball and one football set (all three composed of retired players) over the next three years before it folded in 1995.

In 1999, he ran an Internet service provider (ISP) under the name Hitter.Net (formally known as Hitter Communications) that offered purportedly nationwide dial-up Internet access. The ostensibly nationwide dial up service was offered as a white label product of AT&T with local dialup being provided by equipment at the Hitter.Net offices in Hernando, Florida. The company was considered to be one of the largest ISPs within the Tampa Bay area. Hitter.Net was assigned a dedicated account team and was onsite weekly 2 to 3 times a week. John Henry also owned an adult web hosting company by the name of Strictly Hosting. The ISP went out of business in 2001 after filing for bankruptcy protection and was acquired by Earthlink. The adult web hosting company also went out of business during 2001 and was sold to another adult web hosting company which continued its operations for a few years afterward.

== Baseball career ==
In 2002, at the age of 33, John Henry entered pro baseball, with Ted pulling strings to get him onto the Red Sox's rookie team in the Gulf Coast League. Dubbed "The Kid's Kid" by the media, John Henry had his father's build but little of his baseball talent: after just two games (where he failed to get a hit in six at-bats), he broke two ribs crashing into the stands in an attempt to catch a foul ball, ending his season. In 2003, Williams signed with the Schaumburg Flyers of the independent Northern League but was released in spring training. Later that season, John Henry played for two teams in the independent Southeastern League: the Selma Cloverleafs and the Baton Rouge Riverbats, where he hit a combined .149 in 27 games.

== Alcor controversy ==
John Henry's father Ted died on July 5, 2002. Announcing there would be no funeral, he had Ted's body flown to the Alcor Life Extension Foundation in Scottsdale, Arizona, and placed in cryonic suspension. John Henry's lawyer produced an informal family pact signed by Ted, John Henry, and Claudia in which they agreed "to be put into biostasis after we die" to "be able to be together in the future, even if it is only a chance."

In his book, Ted Williams: An American Hero, Leigh Montville disputes this document, as he believes it to be a "practice autograph" with the rest of the contract written around it: It was signed "Ted Williams", whereas Williams typically signed legal documents with his full name (Theodore), according to Montville.

Barbara Joyce (Bobbie Jo) Ferrell, Ted's daughter by his first wife, sued John Henry, claiming that Ted wanted to be cremated, and she led a very public campaign against her half-brother. Ferrell, who was in contact with her father but had only met her siblings a few times, had been disinherited by Williams. She also alleged John Henry was planning to sell their father's DNA, a charge John Henry disputed. A judge ruled that the signature on the family pact was Ted's, and the note would stand as his final request. On December 20, 2002, Ferrell withdrew her objections after a judge agreed that a $645,000 trust would be distributed equally among the siblings.

== Death ==
In October 2003, it was announced that John Henry had been diagnosed with acute myelogenous leukemia, the same disease that claimed Ted's brother, Danny, in 1960. He began chemotherapy, and underwent a bone marrow transplant with a donation from Claudia. He died with Claudia and Dolores at his side on March 6, 2004, at the UCLA Medical Center. He was 35.

John Henry's body was then transported to Alcor, in further fulfillment of the agreement.
