= Mike Darwin =

Former president of cryonics organization

Michael G. Darwin (born April 26, 1955), formerly known as Michael Federowicz, is a former president of cryonics organization Alcor Life Extension Foundation. He was president from 1983 to 1988, and research director until 1992. He was also the founder and president of BioPreservation, Inc., and a cofounder, member of the board of directors, and director of research at Twenty-First Century Medicine (a cryobiological/critical care medicine research company) from 1993 to 1999.

== Early life ==
He was born in Indianapolis, Indiana. Because of his interest in evolution and rejection of creationism he earned himself the nickname "Darwin" among his schoolmates. Darwin had a fascination with cryopreservation as a child. In 1968, aged 12, he qualified for the Indiana state science fair with his project "Suspended Animation in Animals and Plants." He dreamed of becoming an astronaut and applying his research to space travel. His registration was lost and his project never judged, but he was given an honorable mention out of a sense of fair play. At the fair, however, he learned that a Dr. James Bedford had been frozen in California. This was the beginning of Darwin's lifelong interest in cryonics.

== Career in cryonics ==
Darwin contacted the Cryonics Society of New York (CSNY) and got from them a considerable amount of literature by Saul Kent, who became his patron. When he was 17, he got an invitation from Saul Kent to cryopreserve a cryonics patient for CSNY. Darwin had built his own cryonics equipment, which he found on his New York visit to be more sophisticated than that CSNY had actually used for cryopreservation. When he began his career as a dialysis technician, Michael adopted "Darwin" as his surname for his cryonics persona, so as not to endanger his career by the association with cryonics.

Darwin and Stephen Bridge co-founded the Institute for Advanced Biological Studies (IABS) in Indianapolis in 1977, which merged with the then-California-based Alcor Life Extension Foundation in 1982. Darwin served as the President of Alcor, and then as the Research Director from 1988 to 1992, leaving Alcor in 1992. About 50 former Alcor members joined in the founding of the CryoCare Foundation, an organization dedicated to cryonics which later went defunct. Darwin founded a company, BioPreservation, which contracted perfusion and transport services to CryoCare.

He is the author of ′History of DMSO and Glycerol in Cryonics′, ′How Dead is Dead Enough?′ (2008), ′Cryonics: Why it has failed, and possible ways to fix it′ (2008).

== Personal life ==
Darwin is a vegetarian. His dog Mitzi is preserved at Alcor.

== Technical accomplishments ==
Darwin was the first full-time cryonics researcher, for one year for Alcor in the 1970s. Darwin worked alongside UCLA cardiothoracic researcher Jerry Leaf during the 1980s, and physician Dr. Steven B. Harris in the 1990s to create many of the key technologies and practices of modern cryonics.

== Published works ==
- Wowk, Brian; Darwin, Michael; Harris, Steven B.; Russell, Sandra R.; Rasch, Christopher M. (November 1999). "Effects of Solute Methoxylation on Glass-Forming Ability and Stability of Vitrification Solutions". Cryobiology. 39 (3): 215–227. doi:10.1006/cryo.1999.2203. PMID 10600255.
- Harris, Steven B.; Darwin, Michael G.; Russell, Sandra R.; O'Farrell, Joan M.; Fletcher, Mike; Wowk, Brian (August 2001). "Rapid (0.5°C/min) minimally invasive induction of hypothermia using cold perfluorochemical lung lavage in dogs". Resuscitation. 50 (2): 189–204. doi:10.1016/s0300-9572(01)00333-1. PMID 11719148.

== See also ==
- Life extension
