= Information-theoretic death =

Term of art in cryonics

Information-theoretic death is a term of art used in cryonics to define death in a way that is permanent and independent of any future medical advances, however distant or improbable. Because detailed reading or restoration of information-storing brain structures is beyond current technology, the term lacks practical importance in contemporary medicine.
