= Future Electronics =

Canadian distribution company

Future Electronics Inc.

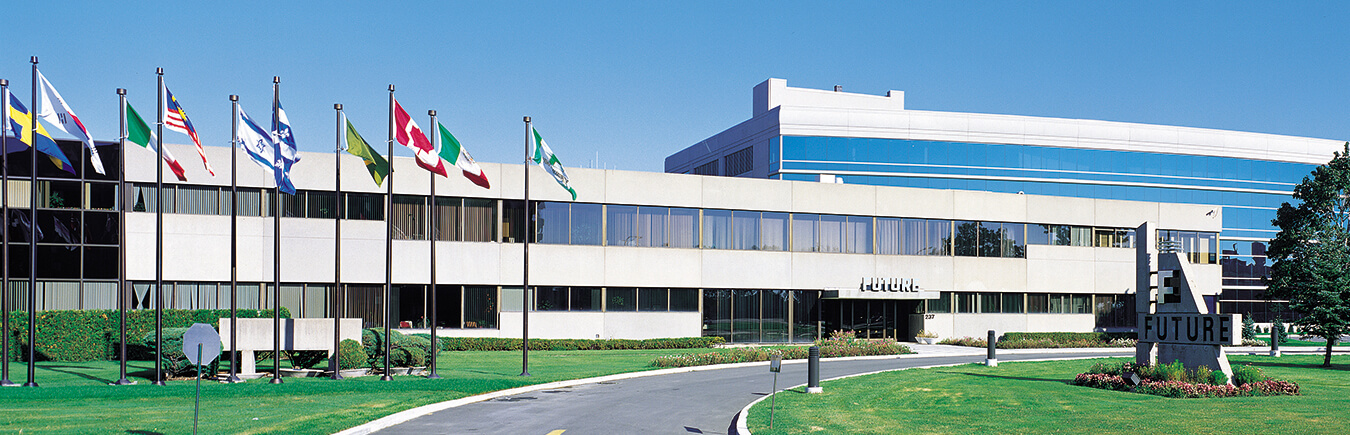
- Headquarters in Montreal, Canada
- Company type: Private Subsidiary
- Industry: Electronics
- Founded: 1968; 58 years ago
- Founder: Robert G. Miller
- Fate: Acquired in 2024 by WT Microelectronics of Taiwan
- Headquarters: Pointe-Claire, Quebec, Canada
- Number of locations: 170 offices in 44 countries
- Area served: Worldwide
- Key people: Omar Baig-Mirza (President)
- Revenue: US$5 billion (2014)
- Number of employees: 5,200 (2023)
- Website: futureelectronics.com

Future Electronics Inc. is a distributor of electronic and electro-mechanical components headquartered in Pointe-Claire, Quebec, Canada.

Until its acquisition in 2024, Future Electronics was one of Quebec's largest privately owned companies and is one of the world's largest electronics distributors. It operates in 170 locations in 44 countries around the world.

The company follows a business model that emphasizes zero debt and the willingness to buy and hold inventories, allowing the company to maintain positive relationship with component suppliers. In 2014, its revenues were $5 billion.

== History ==
Future Electronics was founded in November 1968 when Robert Miller left his job in electronics distribution to form a new company. Alongside his business partner, Eli Manis, Miller set up an office in Montreal and began a distribution operation. In 1972, the pair opened an office in Boston, Massachusetts.

Miller became the sole owner of the company after he bought Manis out for $500,000 in 1976. By 1988, an office in Huntsville, Alabama had opened its doors, and Future Electronics was a major distributor in the United States.

In 1999, the company was raided by the U.S. Federal Bureau of Investigation and the Royal Canadian Mounted Police in a fraud probe into the company. U.S. Department of Justice with the Central Authority of Canada suspected Future Electronics of defrauding TI, Motorola, Analog Devices and other U.S.-based companies, by falsely reporting to Texas Instruments and others the amount of their products that FEC sells. In 2002, the U.S. Attorney's Office announced they would not pursue charges.

In February 2023, its founder ceased to be chairman and CEO amid allegations that he solicited multiple underage girls for sex. He was arrested in May 2024 and charged with 24 sexual offences, including sexual exploitation of minors. Miller pleaded not guilty to the charges. He was later held to be medically unfit to stand trial.

In late 2023, Taiwanese company WT Microelectronics agreed to buy Future from Miller. The US$3.8 billion deal completed on April 2, 2024.

== Leadership history ==
Chief Executive Officers of Future include:

- Robert Gerald Miller (1968–2023)
- Omar Baig-Mirza (2023–present)

== See also ==
- Competitor CDW
- Competitor TD Synnex
- Competitor Arrow Electronics
- Competitor Avnet
