= James Bedford =

American psychologist (1893–1967)

- Born: James Hiram Bedford; April 20, 1893
- Died: January 12, 1967 (aged 73)
- Resting place: Alcor Life Extension Foundation
- Known for: Several books on occupational counseling
- Spouses: Anna Chandler Rice (m. 1917; died 1917) Ruby McLagan (m. 1920)
- Children: 5
- Scientific career
- Fields: Psychology

James Hiram Bedford (April 20, 1893 – January 12, 1967) was an American psychology professor at the University of California who wrote several books on occupational counseling. He is the first person whose body was cryopreserved after legal death, and remains preserved at the Alcor Life Extension Foundation.

== Cryonic preservation ==
In June 1965, Ev Cooper's Life Extension Society (LES) offered the opportunity to preserve one person free of charge, stating that "the Life Extension Society now has primitive facilities for emergency short term freezing and storing our friend the large homeotherm (man). LES offers to freeze free of charge the first person desirous and in need of cryogenic suspension." Bedford did not take this opportunity, however, but later used his own funds. Bedford suffered from kidney cancer that had later metastasized into his lungs, a condition that was untreatable at the time. Bedford died in 1967 at 73 years old. Bedford left $100,000 to cryonics research in his will, but even more was utilized by Bedford's wife and son in court defending both his will and his cryopreservation against arguments created by other relatives.

Bedford's body was frozen with the hope of future revival, claimed by Alcor's Mike Darwin to have occurred within around two hours of his death from cardiorespiratory arrest (secondary to metastasized kidney cancer). His body was preserved by Robert Prehoda (author of the 1969 book Suspended Animation), Dante Brunol (physician and biophysicist) and Robert Nelson (President of the Cryonics Society of California). Nelson then wrote a book about the subject titled We Froze the First Man. Compared to the modern use of cryoprotectants, the methods employed in Bedford's case were primitive. He was injected with a solution of 15% dimethyl sulfoxide and 85% Ringer's solution, a compound once thought to be useful for long-term cryogenics, so it is unlikely that his brain was protected. Vitrification was not yet possible, further limiting the possibility of Bedford's eventual recovery. In his first suspended animation stages, his body was stored at Edward Hope's Cryo-Care facility in Phoenix, Arizona, for two years, then in 1969 moved to the Galiso facility in California. Bedford's body was moved from Galiso in 1973 to Trans Time near Berkeley, California, until 1977, before being stored by his son for many years.

Bedford's body was maintained in liquid nitrogen by his family in southern California until 1982, when it was then moved to Alcor Life Extension Foundation, and has remained in Alcor's care to the present day. In May 1991, his body's condition was evaluated when he was moved to a new storage dewar. The examiners concluded that "it seems likely that his external temperature has remained at relatively low subzero temperatures throughout the storage interval." The date of Bedford's cryopreservation, January 12, is known as "Bedford Day" by some promoters of cryopreservation.

== Personal life ==
Bedford married twice. His first wife, Anna Chandler Rice, died in 1917, the same year she and Bedford were married. Bedford married his second wife, Ruby McLagan, in 1920. Bedford and McLagan had five children: Doris, Donald, Frances, Barbara, and Norman. James Bedford enjoyed photography and extensive traveling.

== Bibliography ==
- Vocational interests of high-school students. University of California School of education, Division of vocational education. 1930.
- Youth and the world's work: Vocational adjustment of youth in the modern world. Society for Occupational Research. 1938.
- Vocational interests of secondary school students. Society for Occupational Research, University of California Station. 1938.
- Occupational exploration: A guide to personal and occupational adjustment. Society for Occupational Research. 1941.
- The veteran and his future job: A guide-book for the veteran. Society for Occupational Research. 1946.
- Your future job: A guide to personal and occupational orientation of youth. Society for Occupational Research. 1950.
- Your future job: A guide to personal and occupational orientation of youth in the atomic age. Society for Occupational Research. 1956.
