= Robert Ettinger =

American academic

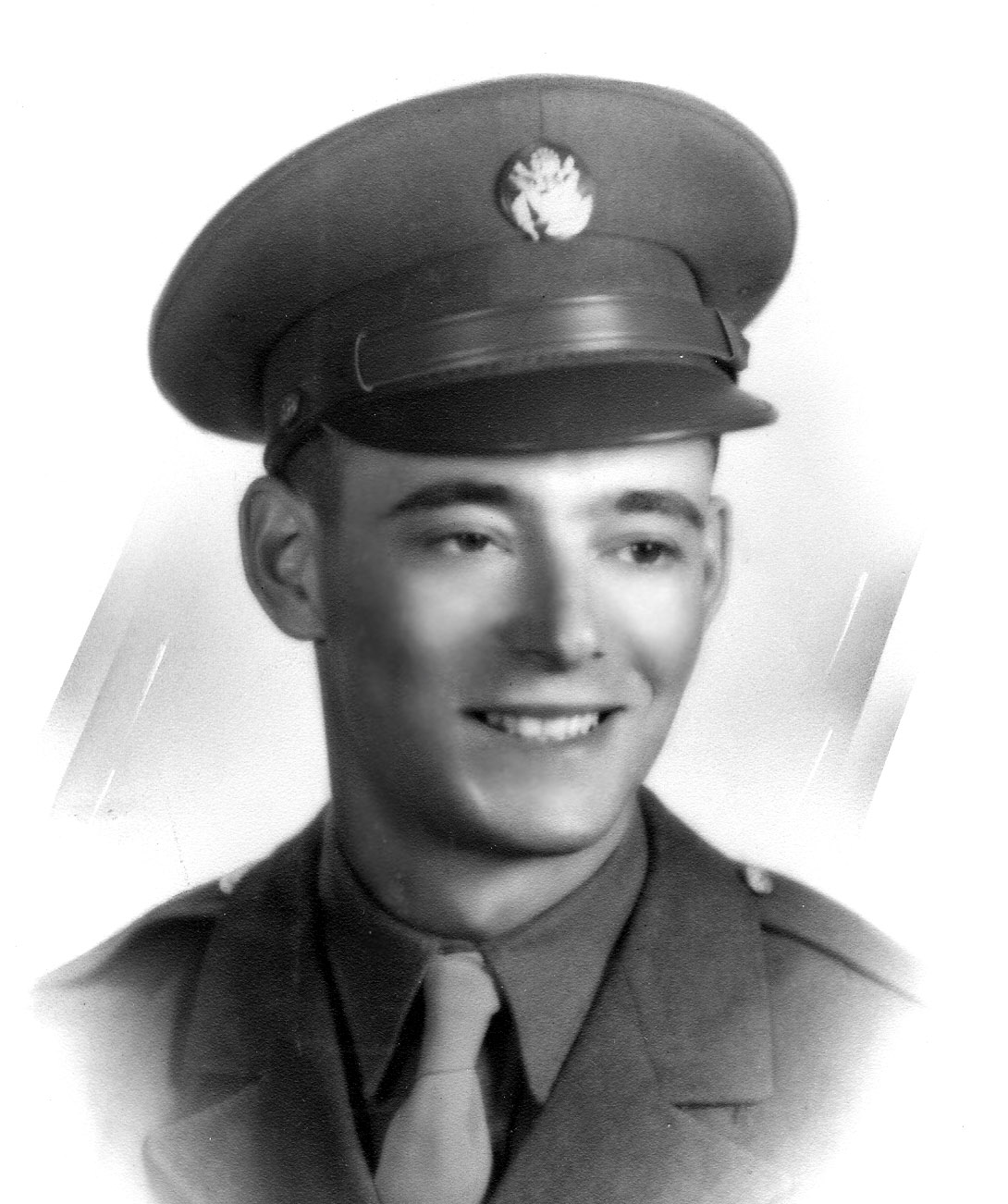
- Photo of Ettinger taken in the 1940s
- Born: Robert Chester Wilson Ettinger; December 4, 1918; Atlantic City, New Jersey, U.S.
- Died: July 23, 2011 (aged 92); Detroit, Michigan, U.S.
- Resting place: Patient at the Cryonics Institute
- Education: Wayne State University
- Organization(s): Cryonics Institute, Immortalist Society
- Known for: Starting the idea of cryonics
- Children: David (1951); Shelley (1954)
- Parent: Rhea Chaloff Ettinger

Robert Chester Wilson Ettinger (/ˈɛtɪŋər/; December 4, 1918 – July 23, 2011) was an American academic, known as "the father of cryonics" because of the impact of his 1962 book The Prospect of Immortality.

Ettinger founded the Cryonics Institute and the related Immortalist Society and until 2003 served as the groups' president. His body has been cryopreserved, like the bodies of his first and second wives, and his mother.

== Personal background ==
Ettinger was born in Atlantic City, New Jersey, the son of Russian Jewish immigrants. Raised Jewish, he later attended Protestant Unitarian church services before becoming an atheist. He served as a second lieutenant infantryman in the United States Army during World War II. Severely wounded in battle in Germany, he received the Purple Heart and recovered after several years spent in a Michigan hospital. He earned two master's degrees from Wayne State University (one in physics, one in mathematics) and spent his working career teaching physics and mathematics at both Wayne State University and Highland Park Community college in Michigan.

Ettinger had two children with his first wife, Elaine, David (1951) and Shelley (1954). David gave his first cryonics interview to journalists at the age of 12 and was an attorney. He served as legal counsel to the Cryonics Institute and the Immortalist Society. Robert Ettinger's daughter, who has had no interest in cryonics, is a writer and revolutionary socialist.

Ettinger met his second wife, Mae Junod, in 1962 when she attended one of his adult education courses in basic physics. Junod typed and assisted with editing the manuscripts for both The Prospect of Immortality and Man Into Superman. She became active in the Cryonics Society of Michigan (CSM) and edited and was a production manager for the CSM monthly newsletter, The Outlook. In the 1970s The Outlook was renamed The Immortalist and Junod continued editorship until the mid-1990s. The Outlook is the longest continuously published cryonics magazine. Junod was an author, feminist, and marriage counselor.

Ettinger married Junod in 1988 after the death of his first wife. Ettinger described his time with Junod as one of the most satisfying and tranquil times in his life. The couple moved to Scottsdale, Arizona in 1995 and enjoyed a period of domestic life during which time the couple began to ease into retirement from over 30 years of cryonics activism and the attendant burdens of work and controversy. Mae Ettinger suffered a debilitating stroke in 1998 from which she never fully recovered followed by a lethal stroke in 2000, which resulted in her cryopreservation.

Ettinger died on July 23, 2011, at the age of 92, in Detroit, Michigan of natural causes, and was cryopreserved with the hope of future revival.

== Roots of cryonics in science fiction ==
Ettinger grew up reading Hugo Gernsback's Amazing Stories. Ettinger was particularly affected when he was 12 years old by a Neil R. Jones story, "The Jameson Satellite," which appeared in the July 1931 issue of Amazing Stories, in which one Professor Jameson had his corpse sent into earth orbit where (as the author mistakenly thought) it would remain preserved indefinitely at near absolute zero. And so it did, in the story, until millions of years later, when, with humanity extinct, a race of mechanical men with organic brains chanced upon it. They revived and repaired Jameson's brain, installed it in a mechanical body, and he became one of their company.

Ettinger assumed that one day — long before he grew old — biologists would learn the secret of eternal youth. As he grew out of boyhood in the 1930s, he began to suspect it might take a little longer since no scientists were yet working on this particular endeavor. If immortality is achievable through the ministrations of technologically advanced aliens repairing a frozen human corpse, then Ettinger thought everyone could be cryopreserved to await later rescue by our own medically more sophisticated descendants.

In 1948, Ettinger's short story "The Penultimate Trump" was published in Startling Stories. The story sets out the development of a method of putting people into "suspended animation" until medical science can restore their health, and the changes found by the first of those when he is revived.

== Launching the cryonics movement ==
Ettinger waited expectantly for prominent scientists or physicians to come to the same conclusion he had, and to take a position of public advocacy. By 1960, Ettinger finally made the scientific case for the idea, which had always been in the back of his mind. Ettinger was 42 years old and said he was increasingly aware of his own mortality. In what has been characterized as an historically important mid-life crisis, Ettinger summarized the idea of cryonics in a few pages, with the emphasis on life insurance, and sent this to approximately 200 people whom he selected from Who's Who in America. The response was very small, and it was clear that a much longer exposition was needed — mostly to counter cultural bias. Ettinger correctly saw that people, even the intellectually, financially and socially distinguished, would have to be educated into understanding his belief that dying is usually gradual and could be a reversible process, and that freezing damage is so limited (even though fatal by present criteria) that its reversibility demands relatively little in future progress. Ettinger soon made an even more troubling discovery, principally that "a great many people have to be coaxed into admitting that life is better than death, healthy is better than sick, smart is better than stupid, and immortality might be worth the trouble!"

In 1962, Ettinger privately published a preliminary version of The Prospect of Immortality, in which he said that future technological advances could be used to bring people back to life. This finally attracted attention of a major publisher, which sent a copy to Isaac Asimov; Asimov said that the science behind cryonics was sound, and the manuscript was approved for a 1964 Doubleday hardcover and various subsequent editions which launched cryonics. The book became a selection of the Book of the Month Club and was published in nine languages.

Ettinger became an "overnight" media celebrity, discussed in The New York Times, Time, Newsweek, Paris Match, Der Spiegel, Christian Century, and dozens of other periodicals. He appeared on television with David Frost, Johnny Carson, Steve Allen, and others. Ettinger also spoke on radio programs coast-to-coast to promote the idea of human cryopreservation.

Since the commercial publication of The Prospect of Immortality, all those active in cryonics today can trace their involvement, directly or indirectly, to the publication of one or both of Ettinger's books. While Ettinger was the first person to argue the idea of cryonics, he was not the only one. In 1962, Evan Cooper had authored a manuscript entitled "Immortality: Physically, Scientifically, Now" under the pseudonym Nathan Duhring. Cooper's book contained the same argument as did Ettinger's, but it was not published.

== Bibliography ==
Short stories

- "The Penultimate Trump" (March 1948)
  - Available online

Books

- The Prospect of Immortality (1962, 1964 and later editions)
  - Available online
- Man Into Superman (1972 and later editions)
  - Available online
- Youniverse: Toward a Self-Centered Philosophy of Immortalism and Cryonics (2009)
