= Alcor Life Extension Foundation =

American cryonics provider

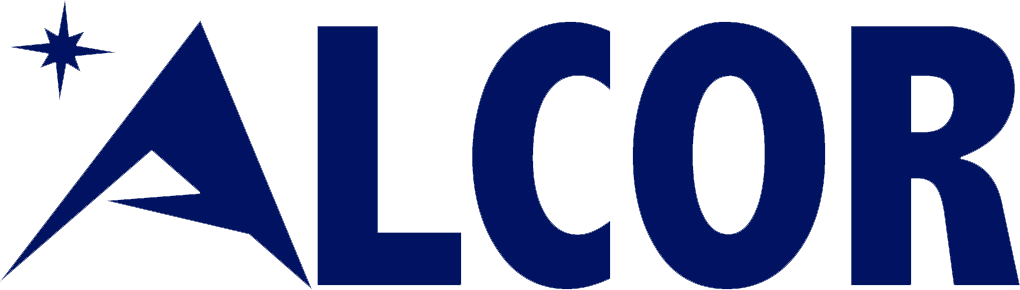
- Founded: 1972; 54 years ago
- Founder: Fred & Linda Chamberlain
- Type: 501(c)(3)
- Tax ID no.: 23-7154039
- Registration no.: F-0715896-5
- Purpose: Cryonics
- Location: 7895 East Acoma Drive Suite 110, Scottsdale, Arizona 85260
- Coordinates: 33°37′2.52″N 111°54′39.36″W
- Region served: Global
- Method: Application and further development of cryonics. Education of the public about cryonics.
- Key people: James Arrowood (President & CEO)
- Revenue: Membership fees and donations; The Alcor Patient Care Trust
- Employees: 12
- Website: alcor.org
- Formerly called: Alcor Society for Solid State Hypothermia

The Alcor Life Extension Foundation, most often referred to as Alcor, is an American nonprofit, federally tax-exempt, 501(c)(3) organization based in Scottsdale, Arizona, United States. Alcor advocates for, researches, and performs cryonics, the freezing of human corpses and brains in liquid nitrogen after legal death, with hopes of resurrecting and restoring them to full health if the technology to do so becomes available in the future. Cryonics is regarded with skepticism within the scientific community and has been characterized as quackery and pseudoscience.

As of October 2023, Alcor had 1,927 members, including 222 who have died and whose corpses have been subject to cryonic processes; 116 bodies had only their head preserved. Alcor also applies its cryonic process to the bodies of pets. As of February 2009, there were 33 animal bodies preserved.

== History ==
The organization was established as a nonprofit organization by Fred and Linda Chamberlain in California in 1972 as the Alcor Society for Solid State Hypothermia. Alcor was named after a faint star in the Big Dipper. The name was changed to Alcor Life Extension Foundation in 1977. The organization was conceived as a rational, technology-oriented cryonics organization that would be managed on a fiscally conservative basis. Alcor advertised in direct mailings and offered seminars in order to attract members and bring attention to the cryonics movement. The first of these seminars attracted 30 people.

On July 16, 1976, Alcor performed its first human cryopreservation on Fred Chamberlain's father. That same year, research in cryonics began with initial funding provided by the Manrise Corporation. At that time, Alcor's office consisted of a mobile surgical unit in a large van. Trans Time, Inc., a cryonics organization in the San Francisco Bay area, provided initial preservation procedures and long-term storage until Alcor began doing its own storage in 1982.

In 1977, articles of incorporation were filed in Indianapolis by the Institute for Advanced Biological Studies (IABS) and Soma, Inc. IABS was a nonprofit research startup led by a young cryonics enthusiast named Steve Bridge, while Soma was intended as a for-profit organization to provide cryopreservation and human storage services. Its president, Mike Darwin, subsequently became a president of Alcor. Bridge filled the same position many years later. IABS and Soma relocated to California in 1981. Soma was disbanded, while IABS merged with Alcor in 1982.

Alcor grew slowly in its early years. In 1984, it merged with the Cryonics Society of South Florida. Alcor counted only 50 members in 1985, which was the year it cryopreserved its third patient. However, during this time researchers associated with Alcor contributed some of the most important techniques related to cryopreservation, eventually leading to today's method of vitrification.

Increasing growth in membership during this period is partially attributed to the 1986 publication of Eric Drexler's Engines of Creation, which debuted the idea of nanotechnology and contained a chapter on cryonics. In 1986, a group of Alcor members formed Symbex, a small investment company which funded a building in Riverside, California, for lease by Alcor. Alcor moved from Fullerton, California, to the new building in Riverside in 1987; Timothy Leary appeared at the grand opening. Alcor cryopreserved a member's companion animal in 1986, and two people in 1987. Three human cases were handled in 1988, including the first whole body patient of Alcor's, and one in 1989. At that time, Alcor owned 20% interest in Symbex, with a goal of 51% ownership. In September 1988, Leary announced that he had signed up with Alcor, becoming the first celebrity to become an Alcor member. Leary later switched to a different cryonics organization, CryoCare, and then changed his mind altogether. Alcor's vice-president, director, head of suspension team and chief surgeon, Jerry Leaf, died suddenly of a heart attack in 1991.

By 1990, Alcor had grown to 300 members and outgrown its California headquarters, which was the largest cryonics facility in the world. The organization wanted to remain in Riverside County, but in response to concerns that the California facility was also vulnerable to earthquake risk, the organization purchased a building in Scottsdale, Arizona in 1993 and moved its stored bodies to it in 1994.

According to a 2007 Forbes profile, Canadian businessman Robert Miller, founder of Future Electronics, is a financial supporter of Alcor. and in 2013, that publication reported that he intends to be cryopreserved himself.

== Policies and procedures ==
Most Alcor members fund cryonic preservation through life insurance policies which name Alcor as the beneficiary. Members who have signed up wear medical alert bracelets informing hospitals and doctors to notify Alcor in case of any emergency; in the case of a person who is known to be near death, Alcor can send a team for remote standby.

In some states, members can sign certificates stating that they wish to decline an autopsy. The cutting of the body organs (especially the brain) and blood vessels required for an autopsy makes it difficult to either preserve the body, especially the brain, without damage or perfuse the body with glycerol. The optimum preservation procedure begins less than one hour after death. Members can specify whether they wish Alcor to attempt to preserve even if an autopsy occurs, or whether they wish to be buried or cremated if an autopsy renders little hope for preservation.

In cases with remote standby, cardiopulmonary support is begun as soon as a person is declared legally dead. Some people were not able to receive cardiopulmonary support immediately, but their dead bodies have been preserved as well as possible. Alcor has a network of paramedics nationwide and seven surgeons, located in different regions, who are on call 24 hours a day.

Corpses are transported as quickly as possible to Alcor headquarters in Scottsdale, where they undergo final preparations in Alcor's cardiopulmonary bypass lab. In the Patient Care Bay they are monitored by computer sensors while kept in liquid nitrogen in dewars. Liquid nitrogen is refilled on a weekly basis. Riverside County, California deputy coroner Dan Cupido said that Alcor had better equipment than some medical facilities.

Membership dues cover one-third of Alcor's yearly budget, with donations and case income from cryopreservations covering the rest. Alcor receives $50,000 each year from television royalties donated by sitcom writer and producer Richard C. Jones who is in suspension. In 1997, after a substantial effort led by then-president Steve Bridge, Alcor formed the Patient Care Trust as an entirely separate entity to manage and protect the funding for storage, including owning the building. Alcor remains the only cryonics organization to segregate and protect funding in this way; the 2% annual growth of the Trust is enough for upkeep of the corpses. At least $115,000 of the money received for each full body goes into this trust for future storage, and $25,000 for a brain. Some members have already taken steps to do this on their own.

== Living clients ==
Living clients include Robert G. Miller, Paris Hilton, Peter Thiel and others.

== Stored corpses ==
Stored corpses include those of Dick Clair, an Emmy Award-winning television sitcom writer and producer, Hall of Fame baseball legend Ted Williams and his son John Henry Williams, and futurist FM-2030.

Corpse storage has grown at a rate of about eight percent a year since Alcor's inception, tripling between 1987 and 1990. The oldest stored body (by age at decease) is a 101-year-old woman, and the youngest is a 2-year-old girl. Alcor has had customers from Australia. One in four of its customers reside(d) in the San Francisco Bay Area.

== Cases and controversies ==
=== Dora Kent ===
Before the company moved to Arizona from Riverside, California, in 1994, it became a center of controversy when a county coroner ruled that Alcor client Dora Kent (Alcor board member Saul Kent's mother) was murdered with barbiturates before her head was removed for preservation by the company's staff. Alcor contended that the drug was administered after her death. No charges were ever filed; former Riverside County deputy coroner Alan Kunzman later said that this was due to mistakes and poor decision-making by others in his office.

A judge ruled that Kent was already deceased at the time of preservation, and no foul play was involved. Alcor sued the county for false arrest and illegal seizure and won both suits. The incident is credited with spurring a growth in membership for Alcor due to the resultant publicity.

=== Ted Williams ===
In 2002, Alcor drew considerable attention when baseball star Ted Williams was placed in cryonic suspension; although Alcor maintains privacy of its patients if they wish and did not disclose that Williams was at the Scottsdale facility, the situation came to light in court documents that grew out of an extended family dispute over Williams' wishes for his remains. While Williams' children Claudia and John Henry contended that Williams wished to be preserved at Alcor, their half-sister and oldest Williams child Bobby-Jo Ferrell contested that her father wished to be cremated. Williams' attorney produced a note signed by Williams, John Henry, and Claudia saying: "JHW, Claudia and Dad all agree to be put into biostasis after we die. This is what we want, to be able to be together in the future, even if it is only a chance." John Henry later said, "He was very into science and believed in new technology and human advancement and was a pioneer. Even though things seemed impossible at times, he always knew there was always a chance to catch a fish – only if you had your fly in the water."

In 2003, Sports Illustrated published allegations by former Alcor COO Larry Johnson that the company had mishandled Williams' head by drilling holes and accidentally cracking it. Johnson also claimed that some of Williams' DNA was missing; the article states that Williams' son, John Henry Williams, desired to sell some of his father's DNA, a charge John Henry denied. Williams' attorney called the DNA allegations an "absurd proposition" and accused Johnson of trying to grab headlines. Alcor denied the allegations of missing DNA.

John Henry Williams subsequently died of leukemia, and his remains are also stored at Alcor. After John Henry's death, Ferrell again filed a lawsuit, but representatives of Williams' estate repeated that he wished to be at Alcor.

In addition to his Williams allegations, Johnson handed over to the police a taped conversation in which he claimed that Alcor facilities engineer Hugh Hixon stated that an Alcor employee deliberately hastened the imminent death of a terminally ill AIDS patient in 1992 with an injection of Metubine, a paralytic drug. In 2009, Carlos Mondragon, Alcor's CEO at the time, told ABC News he had been made aware of the allegations at the time of the case, and as a result had severed Alcor's ties with the employee who allegedly hastened the patient's death.

=== Mary Robbins lawsuit ===
Mary Robbins, a woman living in Colorado Springs, Colorado, signed up with Alcor in 2006, naming the organization as the beneficiary of a $50,000 annuity to cover the harvesting and storage expense. When she was diagnosed with advanced cervical cancer in December 2009, she contacted Alcor to let them know. The company instructed her to move to Alcor's headquarters in Phoenix, Arizona, due to the "lengthy list of after-death protocols that the company requires to prep the body for freezing, including administering a cocktail of medications". Because Robbins's hospice was not able to carry out these procedures, her family said that she changed the beneficiary of the annuity from Alcor to her family. After a Colorado probate court judge ruled in favor of Alcor, they reached a settlement in which Alcor renounced claims on the annuity in exchange for Robbins's remains.

=== Alcor Life Extension Foundation v. Richardson (2010) ===
When Alcor member Orville Richardson died in 2009, his two siblings, who served as co-conservators after he developed dementia, buried his remains even though they knew about his agreement with Alcor. Alcor sued them when they found out about Richardson's death to have the body exhumed so his head could be preserved. Initially, a district court ruled against Alcor, but upon appeal, the Iowa Court of Appeals ordered Richardson's remains be disinterred and transferred to the custody of Alcor a year after they had been buried in May 2010.

== See also ==
- Information-theoretic death
- Cryonics Institute
- 21st Century Medicine
- Biomedical Research & Longevity Society
