= Cryonics Institute =

Human and pet preservation by freezing

- Founded: 4 April 1976; (50 years ago)
- Founder: Robert Ettinger
- Tax ID no.: 38-2157001
- Purpose: Cryopreservation of humans and pets
- Location: 24355 Sorrentino Court, Charter Township of Clinton, Michigan 48035
- Region served: Global
- Key people: Dennis Kowalski, Andy Zawacki, Mike McCauley
- Website: www.cryonics.org

The Cryonics Institute (CI) is an American nonprofit foundation that provides cryonics services. CI freezes deceased humans and pets in liquid nitrogen with the hope of restoring them with technology in the future.

== History ==
The Cryonics Institute was founded by the “Father of Cryonics” Robert Ettinger on April 4, 1976, in Detroit, Michigan, where he served as president until 2003. Ettinger introduced the concept of cryonics with the publication of his book “The Prospect of Immortality” published in 1962. Operations moved to Clinton Township, Michigan in 1993, where it is currently located. The Cryonics Institute currently has 2,322 members worldwide, of which 278 have already been cryopreserved, making it the largest cryonics provider in the world.

== Operations and procedures ==
The cryonics procedure performed by the Cryonics Institute begins with a process called vitrification where the body is perfused with cryoprotective agents to protect against damage in the freezing process. After this, the body is cooled to -196°C over a day or two days in a computer-controlled chamber before being placed in a long-term storage container filled with liquid nitrogen. The Cryonics Institute utilizes storage units called cryostats, and each unit contains up to eight people. The process can take place only once the person has been declared legally dead. Ideally, the process begins within two minutes of the heart-stopping and no more than 15.

The Cryonics Institute also specializes in Human Cryostasis, DNA/Tissue Freezing, Pet Cryopreservation, and Memorabilia Storage.

The cryonics institute finances itself through membership dues and donations. The cost for cryopreservation is less than $30,000 but the total costs including logistics might add up to more than $100,000. There are multiple ways to cover the cost of cryopreservation, like special life insurance policies.

== See also ==
- Information-theoretic death
