= Cryonics =

Freezing of a corpse with the intent of future revival

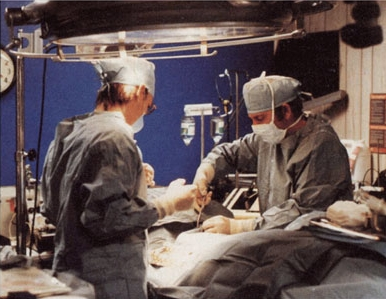
Technicians preparing a body for cryopreservation in 1985

Cryonics (from Greek: κρύος kryos 'cold') is the low-temperature freezing (usually at −196 °C or −320.8 °F or 77.1 K) and storage of human remains in the hope that resurrection may be possible in the future. Cryonics is regarded with skepticism by the mainstream scientific community. It is generally viewed as a pseudoscience, and its practice has been characterized as quackery.

Cryonics procedures can begin only after the "patients" are clinically and legally dead. Procedures may begin within minutes of death, and use cryoprotectants to try to prevent ice formation during cryopreservation. It is not possible to reanimate a corpse that has undergone vitrification (ultra-rapid cooling), as this damages the brain, including its neural circuits. The first corpse to be frozen was that of James Bedford, in 1967. As of 2024, approximately 600 corpses had been subjected to cryonics worldwide.

Additionally, economic considerations make it unlikely that cryonics corporations could remain in business long enough to deliver on their promises if the resurrection promised by cryonics ever becomes technologically possible. The "patients", being dead, cannot continue to pay for their own preservation.

== Conceptual basis ==
Cryonicists argue that as long as brain structure remains intact, there is no fundamental barrier, given our current understanding of physics, to recovering its information content. Cryonics proponents go further than the mainstream consensus in saying that the brain does not have to be continuously active to survive or retain memory. Cryonicists controversially say that a human can survive even within an inactive, badly damaged brain, as long as the original encoding of memory and personality can be adequately inferred and reconstituted from what remains.

Cryonics uses temperatures below −130 °C, called cryopreservation, in an attempt to preserve enough brain information to permit the revival of the cryopreserved person. Cryopreservation is accomplished by freezing with or without cryoprotectant to reduce ice damage, or by vitrification to avoid ice damage. Even using the best methods, cryopreservation of whole bodies or brains is very damaging and irreversible with current technology.

Cryonicists call the human remains packed into low-temperature vats "patients". They hope that some kind of presently nonexistent nanotechnology will be able to bring the dead back to life and treat the diseases that killed them. Mind uploading has also been proposed.

== Cryonics in practice ==
As of 2018, the cost of preparing and storing corpses using cryonics ranged from US$28,000 to $200,000.

At high concentrations, cryoprotectants can stop ice formation completely. Cooling and solidification without crystal formation is called vitrification. In the late 1990s, cryobiologists Gregory Fahy and Brian Wowk developed the first cryoprotectant solutions that could vitrify at very slow cooling rates while still allowing whole organ survival, for the purpose of banking transplantable organs. This has allowed animal brains to be vitrified, thawed, and examined for ice damage using light and electron microscopy. No ice crystal damage was found; cellular damage was due to dehydration and toxicity of the cryoprotectant solutions.

Costs can include payment for medical personnel to be on call for death, vitrification, transportation in dry ice to a preservation facility, and payment into a trust fund intended to cover indefinite storage in liquid nitrogen and future revival costs. As of 2011, U.S. cryopreservation costs can range from $28,000 to $200,000, and are often financed via life insurance. KrioRus, which stores bodies communally in large dewars, charges $12,000 to $36,000 for the procedure. Some customers opt to have only their brain cryopreserved ("neuropreservation"), rather than their whole body.

As of 2014, about 250 corpses have been cryogenically preserved in the U.S., and around 1,500 people have signed up to have their remains preserved. As of 2022, five facilities retained cryopreserved bodies: three in the U.S., one in Russia, and one in Berlin.

It seems extremely unlikely that any cryonics company could exist long enough to take advantage of the supposed benefits offered; historically, even the most robust corporations have only a one-in-a-thousand chance of lasting 100 years. Many cryonics companies have failed; as of 2018, all but one of the pre-1973 batch had gone out of business, and their stored corpses have been defrosted and disposed of.

In 2026 the NHS had a request for freezing the corpse of a person who had died at University Hospital Southampton NHS Foundation Trust, the first known request in the United Kingdom. The body was transferred to the United States.

== Obstacles to success ==
=== Preservation damage ===
Medical laboratories have long used cryopreservation to maintain animal cells, human embryos, and even some organized tissues, for periods as long as three decades, but recovering large animals and organs from a frozen state is not considered possible now. Large vitrified organs tend to develop fractures during cooling, a problem worsened by the large tissue masses and very low temperatures of cryonics. Without cryoprotectants, cell shrinkage and high salt concentrations during freezing usually prevent frozen cells from functioning again after thawing. Ice crystals can also disrupt connections between cells that are necessary for organs to function.

Some cryonics organizations use vitrification without a chemical fixation step, sacrificing some structural preservation quality for less damage at the molecular level. Some scientists, like João Pedro Magalhães, have questioned whether using a deadly chemical for fixation eliminates the possibility of biological revival, making chemical fixation unsuitable for cryonics.

Outside of cryonics firms and cryonics-linked interest groups, many scientists are very skeptical about cryonics methods. Cryobiologist Dayong Gao has said, "we simply don't know if [subjects have] been damaged to the point where they've 'died' during vitrification because the subjects are now inside liquid nitrogen canisters." Based on experience with organ transplants, biochemist Ken Storey argues that "even if you only wanted to preserve the brain, it has dozens of different areas which would need to be cryopreserved using different protocols".

=== Revival ===
Revival would require repairing damage from lack of oxygen, cryoprotectant toxicity, thermal stress (fracturing), and freezing in tissues that do not successfully vitrify, followed by reversing the cause of death. In many cases, extensive tissue regeneration would be necessary. This revival technology remains speculative.

=== Legal issues ===
Historically, people had little control over how their bodies were treated after death, as religion held jurisdiction over the matter. Later, secular courts began to exercise jurisdiction over corpses and use discretion in carrying out deceased people's wishes. Most countries legally treat preserved bodies as deceased persons because of laws that forbid vitrifying someone who is medically alive. In France, cryonics is not considered a legal mode of body disposal; only burial, cremation, and formal body donation to science are allowed, though bodies may legally be shipped to other countries for cryonic freezing. As of 2015, British Columbia prohibits the sale of arrangements for cryonic body preservation. In Russia, cryonics falls outside both the medical industry and the funeral services industry, making it easier than in the U.S. to get hospitals and morgues to release cryonics candidates.

In 2016, the English High Court ruled in favor of a mother's right to seek cryopreservation of her terminally ill 14-year-old daughter, as the girl wanted, contrary to the father's wishes. The decision was made on the basis that the case represented a conventional dispute over the disposal of the girl's body, although the judge urged ministers to seek "proper regulation" for the future of cryonic preservation after the hospital raised concerns about the competence and professionalism of the team that conducted the preservation procedures. In Alcor Life Extension Foundation v. Richardson, the Iowa Court of Appeals ordered the disinterment of Richardson, who was buried against his wishes, for cryopreservation.

A detailed legal examination by Jochen Taupitz concludes that cryonic storage is legal in Germany for an indefinite period.

== Ethics ==
Writing in Bioethics in 2009, David Shaw examined cryonics. The arguments he cited against it included changing the concept of death, the expense of preservation and revival, lack of scientific advancement to permit revival, temptation to use premature euthanasia, and failure due to catastrophe. Arguments in favor of cryonics include the potential benefit to society, the prospect of immortality, and the benefits associated with avoiding death. Shaw explores the expense and the potential payoff, and applies an adapted version of Pascal's Wager to the question. He argues that someone who bets on cryonic preservation risks losing "a bit of money" but potentially gains a longer life and perhaps immortality. Shaun Pattinson responds that Shaw's calculation is incomplete because "being revived only equates to winning the wager if the revived life is worth living. A longer life of unremitting suffering, perhaps due to irreparable nerve damage or even the actions of an evil reviver, is unlikely to be considered preferable to non-revival".

In 2016, Charles Tandy wrote in support of cryonics, arguing that honoring someone's last wishes is seen as a benevolent duty in American and many other cultures.

== History ==
Cryopreservation was applied to human cells beginning in 1954 with frozen sperm, which was thawed and used to inseminate three women. The freezing of humans was first scientifically proposed by Michigan professor Robert Ettinger in The Prospect of Immortality (1962). In 1966, the first human body was frozen—though it had been embalmed for two months—by being placed in liquid nitrogen and stored at just above freezing. The middle-aged woman from Los Angeles, whose name is unknown, was soon thawed and buried by relatives.

Early attempts at cryonic preservation were made in the 1960s and early 1970s; most relied on family members to pay for the preservation and ended in failure, with all but one of the corpses cryopreserved before 1973 being thawed and disposed of.

The first body to be cryopreserved and then frozen in hope of future revival was that of James Bedford. Alcor's Mike Darwin says Bedford's body was cryopreserved around two hours after his death by cardiorespiratory arrest (secondary to metastasized kidney cancer) on January 12, 1967. Bedford's corpse is the only one frozen before 1974 still preserved today. In 1976, Ettinger founded the Cryonics Institute; his corpse was cryopreserved in 2011. In 1981, Robert Nelson, "a former TV repairman with no scientific background" who led the Cryonics Society of California, was sued for allowing nine bodies to thaw and decompose in the 1970s; in his defense, he claimed that the Cryonics Society had run out of money. This hurt the reputation of cryonics in the U.S.

In 2018, a Y-Combinator startup called Nectome was recognized for developing a method of preserving brains with chemicals rather than by freezing. The method is fatal, performed as euthanasia under general anesthesia, but the hope is that future technology will allow the brain to be physically scanned into a computer simulation, neuron by neuron.

== Demographics ==
According to The New York Times, cryonicists are predominantly non-religious white men, outnumbering women by about three to one. According to The Guardian, as of 2008, while most cryonicists used to be young, male, and "geeky", recent demographics have shifted slightly toward whole families.

In 2015, Du Hong, a 61-year-old female writer of children's literature, became the first known Chinese national to have her head cryopreserved.

== Reception ==
Cryonics is generally regarded as a fringe pseudoscience. Between 1982 and November 2018, the Society for Cryobiology rejected members who practiced cryonics, and issued a public statement saying that cryonics "is an act of speculation or hope, not science", and as such outside the scope of the Society.

Russian company KrioRus is the first non-U.S. vendor of cryonics services. Yevgeny Alexandrov, chair of the Russian Academy of Sciences commission against pseudoscience, said there was "no scientific basis" for cryonics, and that the company was based on "unfounded speculation".

Scientists have expressed skepticism about cryonics in media sources, and the Norwegian philosopher Ole Martin Moen has written that the topic receives a "minuscule" amount of attention in academia.

While some neuroscientists contend that all the subtleties of a human mind are contained in its anatomical structure, few will comment directly on cryonics due to its speculative nature. People who intend to be frozen are often "looked at as a bunch of kooks". Cryobiologist Kenneth B. Storey said in 2004 that cryonics is impossible and will never be possible, as cryonics proponents are proposing to "overturn the laws of physics, chemistry, and molecular science". Neurobiologist Michael Hendricks has said, "Reanimation or simulation is an abjectly false hope that is beyond the promise of technology and is certainly impossible with the frozen, dead tissue offered by the 'cryonics' industry".

Anthropologist Simon Dein writes that cryonics is a typical pseudoscience because of its lack of falsifiability and testability. In his view, cryonics is not science, but religion: it places faith in nonexistent technology and promises to overcome death.

William T. Jarvis has written, "Cryonics might be a suitable subject for scientific research, but marketing an unproven method to the public is quackery".

According to cryonicist Aschwin de Wolf and others, cryonics can often produce intense hostility from spouses who are not cryonicists. James Hughes, the executive director of the pro-life-extension Institute for Ethics and Emerging Technologies, has not personally signed up for cryonics, calling it a worthy experiment but saying, "I value my relationship with my wife."

Cryobiologist Dayong Gao has said, "People can always have hope that things will change in the future, but there is no scientific foundation supporting cryonics at this time." While it is universally agreed that personal identity is uninterrupted when brain activity temporarily ceases during incidents of accidental drowning (where people have been restored to normal functioning after being completely submerged in cold water for up to 66 minutes), one argument against cryonics is that a centuries-long absence from life might interrupt personal identity, such that the revived person would "not be themself".

Maastricht University bioethicist David Shaw raises the argument that there would be no point in being revived in the far future if one's friends and families are dead, leaving them all alone, but he notes that family and friends can also be frozen, that there is "nothing to prevent the thawed-out freezee from making new friends", and that a lonely existence may be preferable to none at all.

== In fiction ==
Suspended animation is a popular subject in science fiction and fantasy settings. It is often the means by which a character is transported into the future. The characters Philip J. Fry in Futurama and Khan Noonien Singh in Star Trek exemplify this trope.

A survey in Germany found that about half of the respondents were familiar with cryonics, and about half of those familiar with it had learned of it from films or television.

== In popular culture ==
The town of Nederland, Colorado, hosts an annual Frozen Dead Guy Days festival to commemorate a substandard attempt at cryopreservation.

== Notable people ==
Corpses subjected to the cryonics process include those of baseball players Ted Williams and his son John Henry Williams (in 2002 and 2004, respectively), engineer and doctor L. Stephen Coles (in 2014), economist and entrepreneur Phil Salin, and software engineer Hal Finney (in 2014).

People known to have arranged for cryonics upon death include PayPal founders Luke Nosek and Peter Thiel, Oxford transhumanists Nick Bostrom and Anders Sandberg, and transhumanist philosopher David Pearce. Larry King once arranged for cryonics but, according to Inside Edition, changed his mind.

Sex offender and financier Jeffrey Epstein wanted to have his head and penis frozen after death.

The corpses of some are mistakenly believed to have undergone cryonics. The urban legend that Walt Disney's remains were cryopreserved is false; they were cremated and interred at Forest Lawn Memorial Park Cemetery. (Note: Robert Nelson told the Los Angeles Times that he thought Walt Disney wanted to be cryopreserved, for Walt Disney Studios had called him to ask detailed questions about his organisation, the Cryonics Society of California. However, Nelson clarified that "They had him cremated. I personally have seen his ashes.") Timothy Leary was a long-time cryonics advocate and signed up with a major cryonics provider, but changed his mind shortly before his death and was not cryopreserved.

== See also ==
- Aldehyde-stabilized cryopreservation
- Brain in a vat
- Cryptobiosis
- Deep hypothermic circulatory arrest
- Emergency Preservation and Resuscitation
- Embryo cryopreservation
- Extropianism
- Hibernation
- Life extension
- Organ cryopreservation
- Supercooling
- Targeted temperature management
- Tissue cryopreservation
- Technological utopianism
