= Unconditional cash transfer =

Providing welfare programs without any conditions upon the receivers' actions

Unconditional cash transfer (UCT) programs are philanthropic programs that aim to reduce poverty by providing financial welfare without any conditions upon the receivers' actions. This differentiates them from conditional cash transfers where the government (or a charity) only transfers the money to persons who meet certain criteria. Unconditional cash transfers have developed on the premise that giving cash to citizens allows them to have autonomy over their own lives.

== Types ==
Unconditional cash transfers could vary in a number of ways:

- They could be one-off or recurring: One-off unconditional cash transfers involve either a literal one-time transfer or a transfer over a short period of time, intended to provide people money that they could use for long-term expenses. On the other hand, continuing or recurring cash transfers offer a small sum of money periodically, enabling people to save at a greater rate, or to spend more. Generally, unconditional cash transfers are more likely to be one-off than recurring.
- They could be means-tested at the individual/household level or given to all individuals/households in a given area.
- They could be means-tested at the level of villages or applied to all villages in a given district or region.
- The grant could be made at the individual or household level, and its size could be fixed or variable based on the household size.

== Programs and organizations involved ==
=== SOPREON ===
A payment process using mobile phones was adapted to the complication that 90 percent of the supposed beneficiaries did not have a mobile phone. Instead they were entitled to a SIM card for a mobile phone. The SIM card was, in essence, an entitlement for an amount of money on a given date. The payment process in this case meant bringing the SIM card to a recognized economic center in a community that was nearest to the individual who did not have a mobile phone. There, at the economic center, would be a mobile phone for the SIM card. This adaptation ensured that individuals obliged to cash payment transfers received them efficiently. Concerns about the pricing factor of one mobile phone in the economic center being read by one individual were addressed.

=== GiveDirectly ===
The largest organization exclusively devoted to cash transfers is GiveDirectly. GiveDirectly was founded by economics graduate students in Cambridge, Massachusetts, with two main inspirations: the growing evidence that cash transfers could work, and the growth of cheap and reliable money transfer technology. GiveDirectly's operations were initially limited to Kenya, where the m-Pesa money transfer system is well-established. In November 2013, the organization expanded to Uganda.

Charity evaluator GiveWell first noticed GiveDirectly in July 2011, named it as a standout charity in November 2011, and gave it top charity status starting November 2012. GiveDirectly has been a GiveWell top charity in the years 2012, 2013, 2014, and 2015. Largely as a result of GiveWell's recommendation, Good Ventures, the private foundation of Facebook co-founder Dustin Moskovitz and his wife Cari Tuna, that works closely with GiveWell, has donated well over $40 million to GiveDirectly (in grant sizes of $7 million, $5 million, $25 million, and $9.8 million).

An impact evaluation of GiveDirectly's cash transfer program was conducted in collaboration with GiveDirectly, with the working paper released in October 2013, later published in 2016 after peer review.

The paper attracted commentary from World Bank economist David McKenzie. He praised the robustness of the study's design and the clear disclosure of the study lead's conflict of interest, but raised two concerns:

- The use of self-reporting made the results hard to interpret and rely on (this being a feature of any study that attempted to measure consumption).
- The subdivision of the sample into so many different groups meant that there was less statistical power that could be used to clearly decide which group had better outcomes.

Chris Blattman, a prominent blogger and academic in the area of development economics, with a particular focus on randomized controlled trials, also blogged the study. He expressed two main reservations:

- The observer-expectancy effect, where the people being asked questions may be subtly influenced in their answers by the experimenter's expectations.
- The lack of clear positive effect on long-term outcomes, as well as the lack of increased spending on health and education.

These concerns were in part addressed by other studies. A follow-up of the above study finds net positive spillovers at the community level from unconditional cash transfers. Another study finds beneficial effects of unconditional cash transfer programs not only in self-reported outcomes, but also in health outcomes like body weight and biomass.

=== The CALP Network ===
The CALP Network (CALP) global network of organisations engaged in policy, practice and research in humanitarian cash and voucher assistance (CVA) and financial assistance more broadly. Members currently include local and international non-governmental organisations, United Nations agencies, the Red Cross/Crescent Movement, donors, specialist social innovation, technology and financial services companies, researchers and academics, and individual practitioners. Their website includes a number of studies on unconditional cash transfers, with a particular focus on cash transfers made in the aftermath of natural disasters. Salient examples include:

- UNICEF's Alternative Responses for Communities in Crisis Programme, the largest humanitarian multi-purpose unconditional cash transfer partnership in the Democratic Republic of the Congo.
- Unconditional cash transfers to reduce food insecurity for displaced households and to assist with repatriation in Niger following a food crisis.
- Unconditional cash transfers for relief and recovery in Rizal and Laguna in the Philippines, in the aftermath of Typhoon Ketsana.

The Electronic Cash Transfer Learning Action Network (ELAN) within CaLP has also worked with Mercy Corps, and Humanitarian Policy Group (HPG) on case studies for humanitarian electronic transfer projects in Ethiopia, Zimbabwe, and Bangladesh. These case studies Examine the extent to which:

- recipients used digital financial services (e.g. money transfers, savings, credit, purchases) through mobile money;
- the factors that affected recipients' uptake of these financial services; and
- considerations for future humanitarian programs aiming to increase the use of digital financial services among recipients.

=== Centre for Homelessness Impact ===
Unconditional cash transfers and their impact in communities experiencing or with experience of homelessness have been trialled by the Centre for Homelessness Impact in the United Kingdom. Tests to date have included cash transfers to young people leaving the care system. as well as people with experience of street homelessness

Cash transfers for care leavers found improvements in housing stability, a reduced likelihood of criminality and reduced instances of sofa-surfing.

=== Other programs ===
A blog post by Vishnu Prasad for the Institute for Financial Management and Research summarized existing research on unconditional cash transfers, citing studies around the following programs:

- South African Old Age Pension Scheme, a means-tested unconditional cash transfer scheme in South Africa to women over the age of 60 and men over the age of 65.
- Bono de Desarollo Humano, an unconditional cash transfer scheme in Ecuador
- South Africa's mean, unconditional child grant

== Reception ==
=== Use as a benchmark ===
Jeremy Shapiro, a GiveDirectly co-founder and the person who published GiveDirectly's impact evaluation, has argued for using cash transfers (and more specifically, unconditional cash transfers) as a benchmark against which other development interventions should be evaluated, due to the simplicity and scalability of cash transfers.

Others who have also endorsed the idea of using cash transfers as a benchmark, citing GiveDirectly, include Innovations for Poverty Action and GiveWell.

=== Media discussion ===
Since 2012, there have been a number of media pieces discussing cash transfers, generally in the context of reporting on GiveDirectly. This includes coverage in the New York Times, The Economist, the Freakonomics radio podcast, and Forbes.

== Evaluations of intervention impact ==
A team of the Cochrane Collaboration including researchers from Cornell University, Harvard University, and the Universities of Bremen and Otago conducted the first comprehensive systematic review of the health impact of unconditional cash transfers. The review of 21 studies, including 16 randomized controlled trials, found that although unconditional cash transfers may not improve health services use, they lead to a large and clinically meaningful reduction in the likelihood of being sick by an estimated 27%. Unconditional cash transfers may also improve food security and dietary diversity. Children in recipient families may be more likely to attend school, and the cash transfers may increase money spent on health care. An update of this landmark review in 2022 confirmed these findings based on a grown body of evidence and additionally found sufficient evidence that unconditional cash transfers may also reduce the likelihood of living in extreme poverty.

In 2024 the Centre for Homelessness Impact began an evaluation of the impact of unconditional cash grants for people experiencing homelessness. It conducted a randomised controlled trial to compare outcomes from a group of 125 people who received financial support via a one-time cash grant with those from an otherwise identical group who did not. Findings are expected to be published in 2027.

== See also ==
- Cash transfers (Transfer payments)
- Citizen's dividend
- GiveDirectly
- Global resources dividend
- Social dividend
- Unconditional basic income, which is universally given to every member regardless of their wealth.
- Unconditional versus conditional cash transfers
