= Development Media International =

UK-based non-governmental organization

- Formation: 2005; 20 years ago
- Headquarters: London, England

Development Media International (DMI) is a non-governmental organization with both non-profit and for-profit arms that "use[s] scientific modelling combined with mass media campaigns in order to save the greatest number of lives in the most cost-effective way".

The organization was formed in 2005 and is headquartered in London, England.

== Work ==
DMI designs and implements television and radio campaigns in developing countries to promote healthy behaviours in the target audience. At present, their goal is to focus on reducing preventable child mortality by promoting practices such as sleeping under treated bednets, giving children antibiotics when they have pneumonia, or giving people oral rehydration therapy.

=== Issues of focus ===
DMI is currently focused on messaging that would address the leading causes of death in underdeveloped countries. Whereas the focus in developed countries is on promoting healthy behaviors such as avoidance of smoking or road traffic safety, communicable diseases are still the leading cause of death and morbidity in underdeveloped countries, and DMI's public messaging is aimed at encouraging people to take appropriate measures to prevent and check the spread of these diseases. Their main issues of focus as of now are:

- Family planning
- Maternal survival
- Newborn survival
- Child survival
- Nutrition
- Hygiene
- Neglected tropical diseases

=== Countries of focus ===
DMI has launched a fundraising initiative called Media Million Lives, which aims to launch nationwide media campaigns to reduce child and maternal mortality in ten high-burden African countries. DMI has worked with the London School of Hygiene & Tropical Medicine to develop a mathematical model to predict the number of under-five lives that can be saved each year by running nationwide media campaigns in a number of African countries. The model predicts that these campaigns can reduce under-five mortality by as much as 23%. Some examples of estimates of the annual number of under-five lives saved include:

Country	Estimate of lives saved per year
Democratic Republic of the Congo	43,200
Mali	16,400
Mozambique	14,600
Zambia	11,200

In April 2014, DMI published midline results from a randomized controlled trial that it is conducting in Burkina Faso to prove that a radio campaign alone can reduce under-five mortality by 15.7%. The evaluation of the RCT is being carried out by the London School of Hygiene & Tropical Medicine.

== Partnerships ==
DMI is a member of The Partnership for Maternal, Newborn and Child Health. Its funders include the Wellcome Trust, the Planet Wheeler Foundation, the Mulago Foundation, Department for International Development of the U.K. The Life You Can Save, GiveWell, Unicef and Open Philanthropy Project. Previous funders include the United States Agency for International Development and others.

== External reviews ==
=== GiveWell ===
In October 2012, charity evaluator GiveWell considered Development Media International as a potential organization to recommend, but decided against it for the time being, saying they hoped to return to a deeper evaluation later.

On May 2, 2014, GiveWell published a blog post by Holden Karnofsky discussing DMI's recently released randomized controlled trial results from Burkina Faso. Karnofsky wrote: "If the results – and DMI's cost-effectiveness calculations – held up, DMI could become a GiveWell top charity with substantially better estimated “cost per (equivalent) life saved” than our current top charities. [...] However, there are many questions we would need to look into before determining whether this is in fact the case. As such, we plan to investigate DMI thoroughly this year. There is some possibility that we will decide to recommend it at the end of this calendar year, and some possibility that we will instead choose to hold off on deciding whether to recommend it until next year, when the study's endline results (which we expect to give a more reliable picture of its impact) are released."

In October 2014, GiveWell published an "ongoing review" of Development Media International.

On December 1, 2014, GiveWell announced its top charities and standout charities for the year. DMI was included among the standout charities, alongside the Global Alliance for Improved Nutrition's Universal Salt Iodization Program, International Council for the Control of Iodine Deficiency Disorders, and Living Goods.

In June 2015, GiveWell published an update to its review of DMI with corrections that increased the estimate of the cost per life saved from $5,236 to $7,264.

=== Giving What We Can ===
Effective altruism advocacy organization Giving What We Can published a blog post about DMI by Emma Howard on May 27, 2014. This was the organization's first close look at DMI. Previously, Giving What We Can had mentioned DMI's ongoing randomized controlled trial as an example of real-world national-scale randomization.

=== The Life You Can Save ===
Effective altruism organization The Life You Can Save considers DMI one of its recommended charities. In June 2020 The Life You Can Save Australia also added DMI to its list of recommend charities.

== Media reception ==
Will Snell of DMI appeared on a panel sponsored by The Guardian on careers in international development. Additionally, Roy Head, CEO of DMI, gave an interview to The Guardian.

Daniel Avis of SOAS Radio interviewed Roy Head, CEO of DMI, on World Radio Day to discuss DMI's work.

== See also ==
- Behavior change (public health)
