= Cash transfer =

Direct transfer payment of money to an eligible person

A cash transfer is a direct transfer payment of money to an eligible person. Cash transfers are either unconditional cash transfers or conditional cash transfers. They may be provided by organisations funded by private donors, or a local or regional government. Cash transfers constitute a critical element in the realm of global social policy, addressing needs ranging from poverty alleviation to crisis response.

== Types ==
=== By purpose ===
Cash transfer programs can be classified into humanitarian cash transfers, which address urgent needs in crisis situations guided by humanitarian principles, and social assistance cash transfers that form a key component of ongoing welfare policies and systems.

==== Humanitarian cash transfers ====
Humanitarian cash transfers provide life-saving humanitarian aid in emergencies like natural disasters, conflicts, and famines, focusing on short-term, immediate relief.

As of 2015, only approximately 6% of humanitarian aid is provided in the form of cash transfers and vouchers. Evidence indicates that it is more cost-effective, better for recipients and more transparent than in-kind aid.

==== Social assistance cash transfers ====
Social assistance cash transfers are part of broader social protection systems aimed at reducing long-term poverty and vulnerability. These transfers target various demographic groups, including the unemployed, single parents, and individuals facing disabilities or old age challenges.

=== By selection of recipients ===
Cash transfer programs may be provided to recipients based on means testing, random-sampling mechanism or through universal provision.

==== Means testing ====
A means test is a determination of whether an individual or family is eligible to receive government benefits, assistance, or welfare, based upon a determination of their financial situation, i.e. their income and assets. A means-tested program is generally one in which eligibility is limited to people whose income falls below a particular determined threshold, such as the poverty line. Such programs are usually financed via tax revenues. Means testing is in opposition to universal coverage, in which benefits are extended to everyone. Means testing increases the administrative burden and can create perverse incentives, such as a poverty trap.

Means testing potential recipients of cash transfers is the more politically acceptable, as money is not perceived to be wasted by including those who do not have a desperate need for the money ("leakage"). This can either be achieved through a screening process of potential recipients, or else by making the benefits of the transfers so low only the most desperate will apply. Yet there are also many problems associated with this method as the transaction costs of screening are very high, due to the need to pay for assessment, the travelling cost of candidates to and from the assessment and also the potential risks for corruption. There also may be a negative effect on social capital as resentment develops of those who receive support by those who do not.

==== Proxy means testing ====
Proxy means testing refers to using proxy indicators to estimate income based on household characteristics when access to databases that contains personal income is not available.

==== Random-sampling ====
A random-sampling mechanism (RSM) is a truthful mechanism that uses sampling in order to achieve approximately-optimal gain in prior-free mechanisms and prior-independent mechanisms.

==== Universal provision ====
A universal basic income provides everyone in a designated social, geographical, age or other such category with the allocated benefits.

Examples include selecting under 5s, pensioners, disabled, and woman-centered households.

It does have many advantages as it increases social unity amongst a section of society benefitting from the programme and avoids the transaction costs of screening. A universal approach requires carefully selecting a target group as some groups may cover a greater number of poor families, but include the less needy. Similarly, a more narrow recipient group risks excluding many of those who do actually need support.

=== By frequency ===
One method of managing a cash transfer is to provide all the money at once in a lump sum, rather than in small regular amounts. Researchers at the Overseas Development Institute carried out a study on the effectiveness of the Swiss Agency for Development Cooperation's experiments with lump sum cash transfers and came out with the following six findings:

1. Lump sum transfers work better in post-emergency than developmental contexts as their potential to be rapidly transferred to the recipients suits the urgency of post-emergency requirements.
2. Success of lump sum transfers greatly depends on the local market and whether there are long-term income generating investments to be made. Areas affected by illness (e.g. HIV/Aids) or other such problems are likely to benefit more from regular small payments.
3. Economic conditions other than limited markets or limited investment opportunities are also important, for instance, if the scale of the transfer greatly exceeds several years of local incomes recipients are unlikely to be able to know how to prudently invest the cash. Where there is a clear investment potential, care should be made to support the recipient while lump sum investment matures, e.g. someone who buys a cow still needs to eat while waiting for the long term benefits (calf, milk) and so must be helped in order to ensure s/he doesn't sell the cow.
4. While business planning, skills enhancement and training support is useful, if a clear investment opportunity (fishing boat, cow, etc.) is available, that is normally enough.
5. Context must be considered, e.g. people cannot build a house if they have no access to land.
6. Large cash transfers risk creating corruption or being used as a tool to gain political support for the government.

== Implications ==
=== Dependency and sustainability ===
Cash transfers have been criticized for being financially unsustainable due to the dependency they can create.

The dean of Ateneo de Manila University's government faculty points to the buffer that the Philippine government had "worked so hard to build" in the decade before the COVID-19 community quarantines, which he stated would fall apart with future humanitarian cash transfers to 80% of the population.

Likewise, Joel Ruiz Butuyan also questioned the effects of increasing cash transfer budgets on the annual national debt.

=== Efficiency ===
A High Level Panel on Humanitarian Cash Transfers was convened in 2015, which found that in many cases, cash transfers were better for people in humanitarian crises. In Somalia, 2.5 times more of aid budgets went directly to aid recipients when given as cash rather than food aid. In Iraq, 70% of Syrian refugees resold large parts of their food aid, in order to purchase what they needed more urgently.

Similarly, a study in Ecuador, Niger, Uganda and Yemen found that 18% more people could have been helped if everyone was given cash, not food.

The panel suggested that governments and non-governmental organizations increase amount of unconditional cash transfers, invest in planning and preparedness, explore delivering cash transfers through private sector systems, longer-term social protection systems and digitally, and improve coordination in the humanitarian aid system.

=== Financial capabilities ===
Cash transfer programmes in developing countries are constrained by financial resources, institutional capacity and political ideology. Governments in poorer countries tend to have restricted financial resources, and are therefore limited in the amount they can invest both directly in cash transfers and in measures to ensure that such programmes are effective. The amount invested is influenced by 'value for money' considerations, as well as by political and ideological concerns regarding 'free handouts' and 'creating dependency'.

=== Inflation ===
Many governments in poorer countries, where cash transfers could potentially have the most impressive impact, are often unwilling to implement such programmes due to fears of inflation and more importantly, dependency on the transfers. Quite often it is NGOs who encourage the schemes. If introduced, these schemes are often directed at the non-working poor (although the DfID backed Hunger Safety Nets Programme is a notable exception). In sub-Saharan Africa transfer values are normally limited to 10 to 30% of the ultra poverty line, though donors are now recommending the provision of a transfer level equivalent to 100%.

Whether due to the cautious approach or not, studies have shown that inflation is often avoided as traders increase their stock in anticipation of the schemes. Furthermore, the projects have often helped to build the state's legitimacy as it helps ensure citizens survival and programmes are targeted at marginalised groups and support their integration (e.g. in Nepal successive governments have used cash transfers to help integrate marginalised groups and reduce the risk of conflict).

=== Monitoring and evaluation ===
Ensuring the participation of poor communities in the monitoring and evaluation (M&E) of social protection programmes – and cash transfer programmes in particular - is gaining support from donors and governments who see potential gains in efficiency, legitimacy and satisfaction. 'Participatory monitoring and evaluation' (PM&E) techniques and mechanisms are particularly effective at giving a voice to the people who receive the money, and, when they work well, they serve increase the accountability of governments, local officials and programme implementers.

Qualitative and participatory research carried out by the Overseas Development Institute (in Kenya, Mozambique, the Occupied Palestinian Territories, Uganda and Yemen) investigating individual and community perceptions of cash transfer programmes reveals that the money has a number of positive, and potentially transformative, effects on the lives of the individuals and families that receive them, including:

• People prefer to receive cash than other forms of assistance (food aid, public works, etc.) because it gives them the freedom to spend the money on the things they feel they need.

• People experience an increase in their quality of life e.g. they are able to construct permanent shelters, have three meals a day and pay health-related costs.

• More children are going to school as a result of receiving the transfer.

• Particularly vulnerable or excluded beneficiaries felt that they were now able to meet the basic needs of their families, giving them greater economic freedom, security and enhanced psychological well-being.

=== Political patronage ===
Cash transfer programs have been criticized for enabling political patronage between legislators and voters and serving as a conduit for legalised vote buying. These programs may be duplicated under different names to provide each prominent legislator a program that can be credited towards them.

JC Punongbayan argued that the selection process, due to their control by representatives' district offices, has led to multiple cash leakages, with barangay officials prioritize relatives and friends in the handing out of benefits, leading to nonpoor and undeserving people receiving benefits. He also points to legislators such as the Speaker of the House of Representatives of the Philippines hosting mass distributions of cash transfers "like a gameshow host giving out prizes in a noontime show" and their allies crediting longstanding Department of Labor and Employment to congressional leaders as evidence of patronage politics.

The City Post claimed that cash transfer programs blur the line between governance and vote-buying. It also excoriated legislative bodies that usurp the functions of the executive and frowns on legislators that use cash transfer programs to promote their candidacies in future elections.

== Examples ==
=== SOPREON ===
A payment process using mobile phones was adapted to the complication that 90 percent of the supposed beneficiaries did not have a mobile phone. Instead they were entitled to a SIM card for a mobile phone. The SIM card was, in essence, an entitlement for an amount of money on a given date. The payment process in this case meant bringing the SIM card to a recognized economic center in a community that was nearest to the individual who did not have a mobile phone. There, at the economic center, would be a mobile phone for the SIM card. This adaptation ensured that individuals obliged to cash payment transfers received them efficiently. Concerns about the pricing factor of one mobile phone in the economic center being read by one individual were addressed.

=== GiveDirectly ===
The largest organization exclusively devoted to cash transfers is GiveDirectly. GiveDirectly was founded by economics graduate students in Cambridge, Massachusetts, with two main inspirations: the growing evidence that cash transfers could work, and the growth of cheap and reliable money transfer technology. GiveDirectly's operations were initially limited to Kenya, where the m-Pesa money transfer system is well-established. In November 2013, the organization expanded to Uganda.

Charity evaluator GiveWell first noticed GiveDirectly in July 2011, named it as a standout charity in November 2011, and gave it top charity status starting November 2012. GiveDirectly has been a GiveWell top charity in the years 2012, 2013, 2014, and 2015. Largely as a result of GiveWell's recommendation, Good Ventures, the private foundation of Facebook co-founder Dustin Moskovitz and his wife Cari Tuna, that works closely with GiveWell, has donated well over $40 million to GiveDirectly (in grant sizes of $7 million, $5 million, $25 million, and $9.8 million).

An impact evaluation of GiveDirectly's cash transfer program was conducted in collaboration with GiveDirectly, with the working paper released in October 2013, later published in 2016 after peer review.

The paper attracted commentary from World Bank economist David McKenzie. He praised the robustness of the study's design and the clear disclosure of the study lead's conflict of interest, but raised two concerns:

- The use of self-reporting made the results hard to interpret and rely on (this being a feature of any study that attempted to measure consumption).
- The subdivision of the sample into so many different groups meant that there was less statistical power that could be used to clearly decide which group had better outcomes.

Chris Blattman, a prominent blogger and academic in the area of development economics, with a particular focus on randomized controlled trials, also blogged the study. He expressed two main reservations:

- The observer-expectancy effect, where the people being asked questions may be subtly influenced in their answers by the experimenter's expectations.
- The lack of clear positive effect on long-term outcomes, as well as the lack of increased spending on health and education.

These concerns were in part addressed by other studies. A follow-up of the above study finds net positive spillovers at the community level from unconditional cash transfers. Another study finds beneficial effects of unconditional cash transfer programs not only in self-reported outcomes, but also in health outcomes like body weight and biomass.

=== The CALP Network ===
The CALP Network (CALP) global network of organisations engaged in policy, practice and research in humanitarian cash and voucher assistance (CVA) and financial assistance more broadly. Members currently include local and international non-governmental organisations, United Nations agencies, the Red Cross/Crescent Movement, donors, specialist social innovation, technology and financial services companies, researchers and academics, and individual practitioners. Their website includes a number of studies on unconditional cash transfers, with a particular focus on cash transfers made in the aftermath of natural disasters. Salient examples include:

- UNICEF's Alternative Responses for Communities in Crisis Programme, the largest humanitarian multi-purpose unconditional cash transfer partnership in the Democratic Republic of the Congo.
- Unconditional cash transfers to reduce food insecurity for displaced households and to assist with repatriation in Niger following a food crisis.
- Unconditional cash transfers for relief and recovery in Rizal and Laguna in the Philippines, in the aftermath of Typhoon Ketsana.

The Electronic Cash Transfer Learning Action Network (ELAN) within CaLP has also worked with Mercy Corps, and Humanitarian Policy Group (HPG) on case studies for humanitarian electronic transfer projects in Ethiopia, Zimbabwe, and Bangladesh. These case studies Examine the extent to which:

- recipients used digital financial services (e.g. money transfers, savings, credit, purchases) through mobile money;
- the factors that affected recipients' uptake of these financial services; and
- considerations for future humanitarian programs aiming to increase the use of digital financial services among recipients.

=== Centre for Homelessness Impact ===
Unconditional cash transfers and their impact in communities experiencing or with experience of homelessness have been trialled by the Centre for Homelessness Impact in the United Kingdom. Tests to date have included cash transfers to young people leaving the care system. as well as people with experience of street homelessness

Cash transfers for care leavers found improvements in housing stability, a reduced likelihood of criminality and reduced instances of sofa-surfing.

=== Other programs ===
A blog post by Vishnu Prasad for the Institute for Financial Management and Research summarized existing research on unconditional cash transfers, citing studies around the following programs:

- South African Old Age Pension Scheme, a means-tested unconditional cash transfer scheme in South Africa to women over the age of 60 and men over the age of 65.
- Bono de Desarollo Humano, an unconditional cash transfer scheme in Ecuador
- South Africa's mean, unconditional child grant

== Impacts ==
=== Health ===
The first comprehensive systematic review of the health impact of unconditional cash transfers included 21 studies, of which 16 were randomized controlled trials. It found that unconditional cash transfers may not improve health services use. However, they lead to a large, clinically meaningful reduction in the likelihood of being sick by an estimated 27%. Unconditional cash transfers may also improve food security and dietary diversity. Children in recipient families are more likely to attend school, and the cash transfers may increase money spent on health care. An update of this landmark review from 2022 confirmed these findings, plus concluded that there is now sufficient evidence that such cash transfers also reduce the likelihood of recipients living in extreme poverty. The present study concluded that cash along with ECD activities have positive impact on child development in Bangladesh.

=== Wellbeing and mental health ===
In 2022, a systematic review and meta-analysis of 45 studies examined the impact of cash transfers on self-reported subjective wellbeing and mental health outcomes, covering a sample of 116,999 individuals. After an average follow-up time of two years, the study found that cash transfers have a small but statistically significant positive effect on both subjective wellbeing and mental health among recipients. The value of the cash transfer, both relative to previous income and in absolute terms, is a strong predictor of the effect size.

== See also ==
- Basic income
- Cash and Voucher Assistance
- Humanitarian aid
- Redistribution of income and wealth
- The Cash Learning Partnership
