= Mulago Foundation =

American philanthropic foundation

- Founded: 1993
- Founder: Rainer Arnhold; Henry Arnhold
- Type: Private foundation
- Location: San Francisco, California, United States of America
- Key people: Kevin Starr (CEO); Kristin Gilliss Moyer (COO)
- Website: mulagofoundation.org

The Mulago Foundation is an American private foundation based in San Francisco that supports organizations with scalable solutions to poverty and environmental challenges. It provides unrestricted grants and, in some cases, debt or equity to nonprofits and for-profit organizations. Its focus is on creating a better life for the world’s poorest people, by investing in agriculture, climate change, education, health & medicine, and water & sanitation.

The foundation was originally envisioned by Rainer Arnhold, a San Francisco paediatrician and philanthropist, whose career combined clinical practice with public health work in Africa, Asia, and Latin America. He taught at Mulago Hospital, Uganda. Following his death in 1993 while leading a medical training expedition in Bolivia, the foundation was officially created by his brother Henry Arnhold.

== Operations ==
=== Criteria for funding organizations ===
The Foundation's stated goal is to identify and invest in the highest impact giving opportunities. They look for three things in potential investment projects: a priority problem, a scalable solution, and an organization that can deliver. Once they identify an organization they wish to fund through their fellowships, they provide unrestricted and continued funding. The Mulago Foundation does not currently accept or solicit proposals. The foundation itself tries to locate organizations to give to through their own network and referrals. The main way they start funding organizations is through their two Fellowship programs - the Rainer Arnhold Fellowship focused on poverty solutions and the Henry Arnhold Fellowship focused on climate solutions. Currently the only route into the portfolio is through their fellowships.

=== Portfolio management and accountability ===
Mulago assesses organizations in its portfolio using internal frameworks described in Making Ourselves Accountable. Their frameworks assess an organization's progress towards taking their idea to scale. Organizations are managed through annual milestones, that look at the "enoughs": is the idea good enough to be worth scaling? This is about impact: they look for consequential effect sizes, high-quality evidence, and a strong case for lasting change. Is it big enough to make a meaningful dent in a big problem? This is about scope—the overlap of where it’s needed and where it would work, and what factors inherent to the model might constrain scale. Is it simple enough that it can be done by others? Specifically the doer at scale (mostly governments, sometimes other NGOs or businesses). The evidence for this starts with a replicable model and is confirmed by observable progress at replication by others. And is it cheap enough that the payer at scale—government, philanthropy, customers, or Big Aid would pay?

=== Organizations funded by Mulago ===
As of Aug 2026, the Mulago Foundation website listed about 80 organizations include Babban Gona, Blue Ventures, Bridges to Prosperity, Dost, Development Media International, Digital Green, Educate Girls, Food for Education, Foundation for Ecological Security, Friendship Bench, Global Forest Watch, Kheyti, Medha, Noora Health, One Acre Fund, Planet Indonesia, SaveLIFE Foundation, Ubongo Learning, Urgewald and Youth Impact.

== Controversies ==
=== More Than Me ===
In 2018, Mulago selected Katie Meyler, founder of the Liberian education charity More Than Me, for a fellowship carrying $50,000 of support. An October 2018 ProPublica investigation documented sexual abuse of students by Macintosh Johnson, a senior employee of MoreThanMe, and failures by the organization to protect children. Journalist Marc Gunther criticized the oversight of More Than Me’s funders, including The Mulago Foundation. In response, Kevin Starr (CEO of the Mulago Foundation) defended the fellowship decision by citing the organization's evaluated performance after it became Partnership for Schools in Liberia. Starr claimed that even thorough donor due diligence may not have uncovered the abuse while also stating that organizations must acknowledge failures, take corrective action, and improve their management systems.

=== Arnold Institute for Global Health ===
The Mulago Foundation and the Arnhold Foundation supported the establishment of the Arnhold Institute for Global Health at Mount Sinai in 2014. In April 2019, eight current and former employees filed a lawsuit against Mount Sinai Health System and four employees, including the institute director, Dr. Prabhjot Singh, alleging sex, age, and race discrimination and retaliation.

== Leadership ==
The Mulago Foundation is led by Chief Executive Officer Kevin Starr, who joined in 1994 and developed the organization's core investment framework. In 2003, Starr established the foundation's Rainer Arnhold Fellows Program. Chief Operating Officer Kristin Gilliss Moyer joined in 2013 and co-created the Henry Arnhold Fellows Program. Partner Avery Bang joined in 2022 to direct portfolio strategy, sourcing, and fellow programs. Avery Bang was previously a Rainer Arnhold Fellow and CEO of Bridges to Prosperity (a Mulago portfolio organization).

== Reception ==
Mulago's CEO Kevin Starr is a regular contributor to the Stanford Social Innovation Review and has regularly been in their top ten most read articles of the year. The concept of the "doer and payer at scale" was first introduced by Kevin Starr and Laura Hattendorf in an article in 2015. The term is now used by many in the social impact sector.

Charity evaluator GiveWell described the Mulago Foundation as an "impact-focused" grantmaker (alongside the Gates Foundation, Skoll Foundation, Children's Investment Fund Foundation, Jasmine Social Investments, and Peery Foundation). GiveWell stated in 2011 that it would consider the list of Mulago Foundation grantees (along with those of the other impact-focused grantmakers listed above, as well as the Draper Richards Kaplan Foundation) as part of its list of charities to review to see if they qualified for GiveWell's highest ratings.

The Mulago Foundation was also mentioned on the Tactical Philanthropy blog, and Kevin Starr of Mulago wrote a guest post for the blog.

Kevin Starr of Mulago wrote an article for the Stanford Social Innovation Review describing Mulago's definition of impact and some of the subtleties associated with the concept. His piece was referenced on the Acumen Fund blog.

On March 11, 2014, Kevin Starr and Laura Hattendorf of the Mulago Foundation wrote a lengthy article in the Stanford Social Innovation Review skeptical of cash transfer charity GiveDirectly's accomplishment so far, saying that the evidence so far was underwhelming, though there might still be bigger gains a few years down the line. They contrasted GiveDirectly with other charities that they felt delivered more bang for the buck: One Acre Fund, VisionSpring, KickStart International, and Proximity Designs. Holden Karnofsky of GiveWell wrote a lengthy response countering that GiveDirectly's impact had been more rigorously established, and that Starr and Hattendorf were using flawed metrics to judge impact. The GiveDirectly board independently published a response on the GiveDirectly blog.

== Similar resources ==
- GiveWell
- Coefficient Giving
- Acumen Fund
- Emerson Collective
- Bill and Melinda Gates Foundation
- Good Ventures
- Jasmine Social Investments
- Omidyar Network
- Peery Foundation
- Skoll Foundation
- Segal Family Foundation
- Draper Richards Kaplan Foundation
