= Huguka Dukore Akazi Kanoze =

USAID-funded youth workforce-development programme in Rwanda

Huguka Dukore Akazi Kanoze (HDAK) was a United States Agency for International Development (USAID)-funded youth workforce-development programme in Rwanda. Led by Education Development Center (EDC) with a consortium of partner organisations, it was launched in late 2016 and implemented through 2021. The programme aimed to provide vulnerable young Rwandans with employability and entrepreneurship training and links to wage or self-employment opportunities.

== Programme ==
HDAK was a follow-on to EDC's earlier Akazi Kanoze Youth Livelihoods Project in Rwanda. According to EDC, the HDAK activity was funded through USAID cooperative agreement AID-696-A-17-00005 and was designed to reach 40,000 out-of-school youth.

The programme combined work-readiness training, technical and entrepreneurship training, work-based learning, and job-placement or self-employment support. Research summaries describe its first module as covering personal development, interpersonal communication, work habits and conduct, leadership, workplace health and safety, worker and employer rights and responsibilities, financial fitness, and entrepreneurship, followed by pathway-specific modules. The programme targeted youth from poor households, with a stated emphasis on women and youth with disabilities.

== Evaluation ==
HDAK became the subject of a randomized controlled trial by economists Craig McIntosh and Andrew Zeitlin in collaboration with Innovations for Poverty Action. The study enrolled 1,848 underemployed youth in Rwamagana, Muhanga, and Nyamagabe districts and compared the programme with unconditional cash transfers delivered by GiveDirectly.

Results published in the Journal of Development Economics in 2022 found that the training programme improved productive hours worked, assets, savings, and subjective well-being. However, cost-equivalent cash transfers produced larger gains on several economic outcomes, including income, consumption, and wealth; business knowledge was the main outcome on which training outperformed cash.

A later follow-up reported that some effects of both interventions persisted in the medium term, but that most impacts had faded relative to the earlier results.

== Legacy ==
During its implementation, HDAK also worked with Rwandan institutions on workforce-development and TVET materials. In 2021, Rwanda Polytechnic said materials developed with support from the programme would be piloted in selected TVET schools before wider rollout.
