= Living Goods =

Non-profit organization

- Formation: 2007
- Founder: Chuck Slaughter
- Type: NGO, United States IRS exemption status: 501(c)(3)
- Headquarters: Nairobi
- Location: Kenya
- CEO: Liz Jarman
- Website: https://www.livinggoods.org

Living Goods is a non-profit organization headquartered in Nairobi, with core operations in Uganda, Kenya, and Burkina Faso.

According to the organization's 2021-2026 Strategic Plan, since 2007, Living Goods has been working to close the gap between the potential of community health workers (CHWs) to improve and save lives and the challenges they regularly face, including insufficient training, supervision, and access to medicines; reliance on antiquated and inefficient paper-based tools; and systems that treat them as unpaid volunteers, rather than as trusted members of a health care delivery system.

The company embraced and codified the DESC approach, through which CHWs are digitally enabled, equipped, supervised, and compensated. DESC is designed to improve the performance of CHWs, ensuring they are incentivized and able to deliver high-quality health care at low cost.

They partner with African governments to ensure that CHWs have the tools, support, and knowledge they need to be successful and reach their full potential. CHWs are community members with basic health training who travel who door-to-door to educate, assess and treat common but deadly illnesses for children under age 5, track and refer them for immunizations, and support women in both pregnancy care and family planning. Living Goods focuses on supporting governments to professionalize CHWs and strengthen the systems in which they work, using digital tools and data, equipping them with medicines and training, and ensuring they are supervised and compensated. With operations in Kenya, Uganda, and Burkina Faso, in 2021 Living Goods supported more than 11,000 CHWs to assist 8.5 million people.

Living Goods was founded by Chuck Slaughter in 2007.

== Supporters ==
Living Goods has received funding from the Children's Investment Fund Foundation, Omidyar Network, the Mulago Foundation, Jasmine Social Investments, the Peery Foundation and many other foundations.

== External reviews ==
=== GiveWell review ===
Charity evaluator GiveWell singled out Living Goods for special recognition in 2009 because Living Goods was cooperating with the Abdul Latif Jameel Poverty Action Lab to perform a rigorous evaluation of its program.

In 2011, Tobias Pfutze, an Assistant Professor of Economics, participated in GiveWell's "Find the Best Charity" experiment whereby he would spend about ten hours researching the best charity (or charities) using GiveWell and then allocate $2500 (funded by GiveWell) to the charity or charities. Pfutze allocated the entire $2500 to Living Goods and explained the rationale for his decision to GiveWell in an interview. GiveWell followed up with a blog post discussing some of the issues raised in the discussion.

In October 2014, GiveWell announced that it intended to make a $100,000 grant to Living Goods, and simultaneously published an "ongoing review" of Living Goods as well as a blog post about it.

On December 1, 2014, GiveWell announced its top charities and standout charities for the year. Living Goods was among the standout charities, alongside Global Alliance for Improved Nutrition's Universal Salt Iodization Program, International Council for the Control of Iodine Deficiency Disorders, and Development Media International.

== Media coverage ==
Living Goods has been covered in The New York Times, NBC, The Guardian, The Economist, National Public Radio, and other news and opinion sources.
