= Coefficient Giving =

American grantmaking foundation

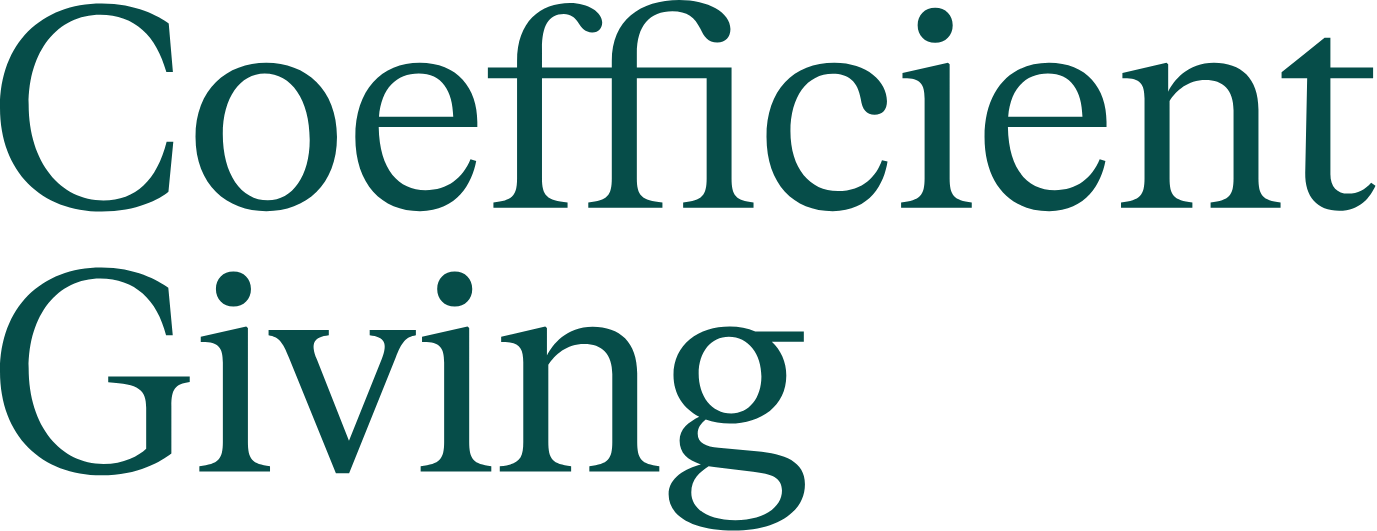
- Current logo
- Formation: September 2011; 15 years ago
- Founders: Holden Karnofsky; Dustin Moskovitz; Cari Tuna
- Location: San Francisco, US
- Region served: Global
- Methods: Grants, funding, research
- Chief Executive Officer: Alexander Berger
- Chair: Cari Tuna
- Board of directors: Dustin Moskovitz, Cari Tuna, Divesh Makan, Holden Karnofsky, and Alexander Berger
- Website: coefficientgiving.org
- Formerly called: Open Philanthropy Project; Open Philanthropy

Coefficient Giving (formerly Open Philanthropy) is an American philanthropic advising and funding organization. It is affiliated with the effective altruism movement. Founded by Cari Tuna and Dustin Moskovitz, its current CEO is Alexander Berger.

As of June 2025, Coefficient Giving has directed more than $4 billion in grants across a variety of focus areas, including global health, scientific research, pandemic preparedness, potential risks from advanced AI, and farm animal welfare. It chooses focus areas through a process of "strategic cause selection" — looking for problems that are large, tractable, and neglected relative to their size.

== History ==
While Coefficient Giving works with a range of donors, its founding and most significant ongoing partnership is with Good Ventures, the foundation of Dustin Moskovitz (co-founder of Facebook and Asana) and his wife Cari Tuna.

Former logo of the organization, before it was renamed Coefficient Giving in 2025.

They were inspired by Peter Singer's The Life You Can Save, and became the youngest couple to sign Bill Gates and Warren Buffett's Giving Pledge, promising to give away most of their money. Tuna left her journalist position at The Wall Street Journal to focus on philanthropy full-time, and the couple started the Good Ventures foundation in 2011. The organization partnered with GiveWell, a charity evaluator founded by Holden Karnofsky and Elie Hassenfeld. The partnership named itself the "Open Philanthropy Project" in 2014, and began operating independently in 2017.

Open Philanthropy has launched collaborative funds in partnership with philanthropic donors, including the Lead Exposure Action Fund and the Abundance and Growth Fund. In November 2025, Open Philanthropy was renamed Coefficient Giving, signaling an expansion toward operating multi-donor funds that other philanthropists can join. Bill Gates has referred to the organization as “a fantastic partner on high-impact giving.”

== Grantmaking ==
In 2024, Coefficient Giving directed over $650 million in grants through recommendations to Good Ventures and other philanthropic partners.

=== Cause selection ===
Coefficient Giving selects causes to work on using three criteria:

- Importance: How many individuals are affected by the problem, and how deeply.
- Neglectedness: Whether the cause receives adequate attention and resources from others, especially other major philanthropists.
- Tractability: The likelihood that a philanthropic funder can contribute to significant progress.

If a cause looks promising according to those criteria, Coefficient Giving researchers review literature and meet with experts to get a better understanding of the area, and then conduct an investigation to determine whether there are enough strong giving opportunities to justify the opening of a new program.

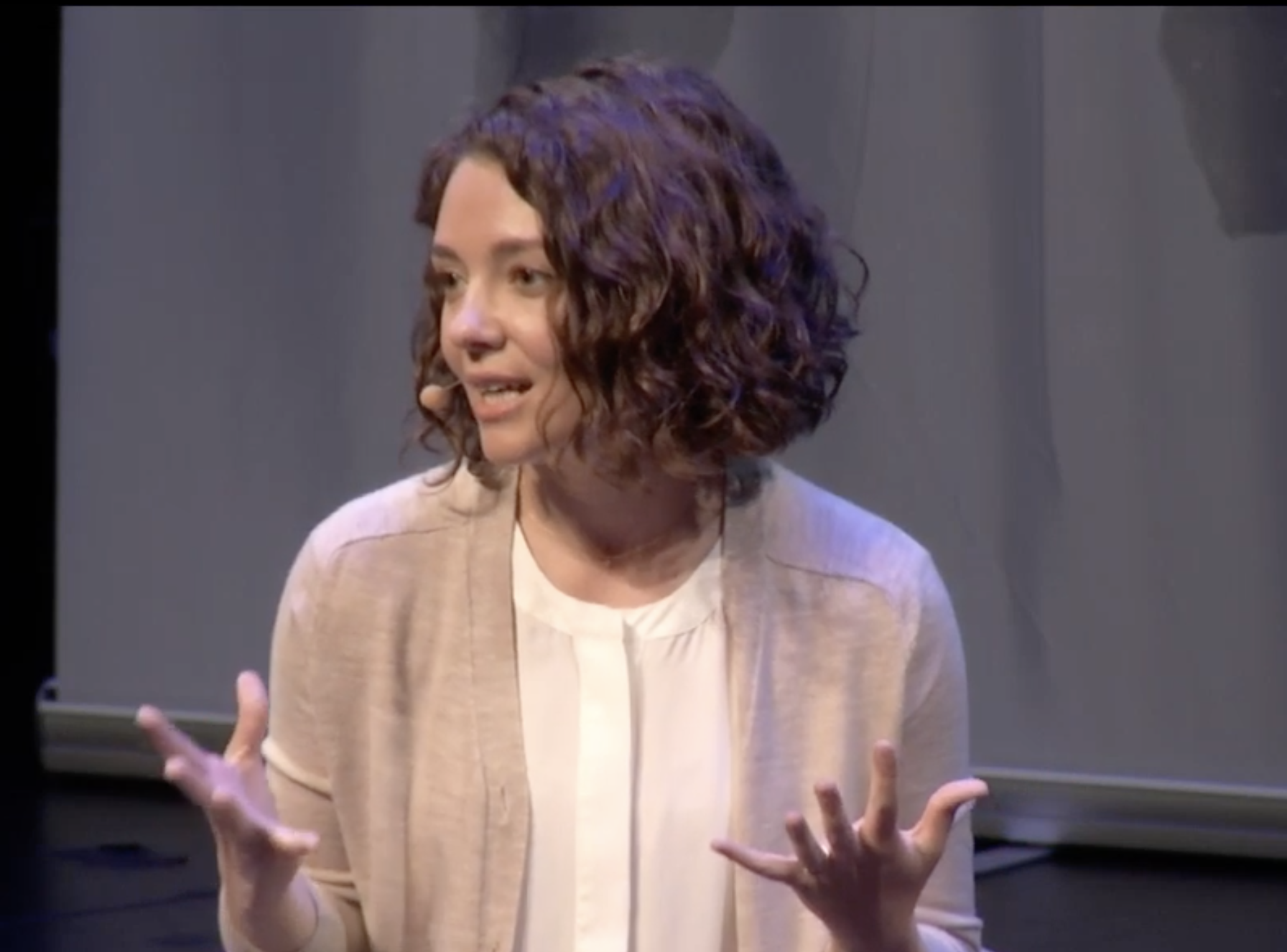
Coefficient Giving Chair Cari Tuna speaking at Effective Altruism Global in 2016.

Across the portfolio as a whole, Coefficient Giving aims to equalize marginal returns across different interventions to maximize overall impact.

=== Impact estimation ===
Coefficient Giving says they use a back-of-the-envelope calculations approach to quantitatively estimate a grant's expected impact in areas such as vaccine research, farm animal welfare, and the development of techniques for detecting environmental lead.

=== Hits-based giving ===
In some cases, Coefficient Giving pursues "high-risk, high-reward" opportunities that don't necessarily have a strong evidence base or a high chance of success, but could potentially become philanthropic "hits" with enormous positive impact. It refers to this approach as "hits-based giving," comparing it to strategies used in venture capital investing.

Examples of philanthropic hits cited by Coefficient Giving include the Green Revolution and the development of oral contraceptives. The organization has itself invested heavily in basic science and other areas with highly uncertain impact — for example, as an early supporter of Nobel Laureate David Baker's work on computational methods for protein design.

== Funds ==
Coefficient Giving's work is split across 13 funds, each of which is focused on a particular area. Each fund pools money from multiple donors and directs it toward what Coefficient Giving believes to be the most promising opportunities in its areas.

=== Abundance and Growth ===
In 2025, the organization launched the Abundance and Growth Fund in partnership with Good Ventures, Patrick Collison, and other donors. The fund will dedicate $120 million over three years to accelerate economic growth and boost scientific and technological progress, building on Coefficient Giving's previous work in housing and innovation policy.

=== Air Quality ===
Coefficient Giving's support for global public health policy includes work to mitigate lead exposure, reduce air pollution in India and other South Asian countries, which kills roughly 2 million people in the region each year.

=== Biosecurity and Pandemic Preparedness ===
Coefficient Giving's work on biosecurity and pandemic preparedness includes support for disease surveillance, restrictions on gain-of-function research, and the development of next-generation personal protective equipment.

Notable grantees include the Bipartisan Commission on Biodefense, the Johns Hopkins Center for Health Security, and the World Health Organization.

Program staff at the Biosecurity and Pandemic Preparedness Fund helped to convene a group of scientists to discuss potential risks from the creation of mirror bacteria. This work was eventually published in Science.

Some have claimed that by "flooding" money into biosecurity, Coefficient Giving is "absorbing much of the field's experienced research capacity, focusing the attention of experts on this narrow, extremely unlikely, aspect of biosecurity risk" (i.e., biological global catastrophic risks).

=== Effective Giving and Careers ===
The Effective Giving and Careers Fund aims to "empower people to use their careers and donations to help others as much as possible." It supports organizations that encourage impact-focused career choices and charitable donations.

Notable grantees include Founders Pledge and Giving What We Can.

=== Farm Animal Welfare ===
The Farm Animal Welfare Fund supports reforming cruel practices on factory farms, developing technologies to reduce animal pain and suffering, and promoting the development and adoption of alternative proteins in hopes of reducing meat consumption.

Coefficient Giving has been called "the world's biggest funder of farm animal welfare."

Notable grantees include The Humane League, Mercy for Animals, and the Good Food Institute.

=== Forecasting ===
Coefficient Giving's Forecasting program works to enable the creation of "high-quality forecasts on questions relevant to high-stakes decisions".

Notable grantees include Philip Tetlock and Metaculus.

=== Global Aid Policy ===
Coefficient Giving's Global Aid Policy program supports efforts to increase aid spending and improve the cost-effectiveness of existing aid programs.

Notable grantees include the Joep Lange Institute, the Center for Global Development, and the Clinton Health Access Initiative.

=== Global Catastrophic Risks Opportunities ===
This fund is dedicated to addressing global catastrophic risks (GCRs) — threats that have the potential to "cause severe or even irreversible harm to humans on a global scale".

While other Coefficient funds focus specifically on risks from AI and biotechnology, this fund supports cross-cutting and foundational work to build capacity for addressing GCRs more generally (e.g. helping people find jobs where they can work full-time on GCR mitigation, or building up related academic fields).

Notable grantees include the Centre for Effective Altruism, Kurzgesagt, and several academics funded to develop courses on relevant topics.

=== Global Growth ===
The Global Growth Fund supports work to “accelerate economic growth and reduce poverty in low- and middle-income countries [LMICs].” It explores strategies like increasing export-oriented manufacturing, developing trade links between advanced economies and LMICs, and supporting economics experts who live in LMICs to work as policy advisors.

=== Global Health & Wellbeing Opportunities ===
This fund supports “evidence-backed interventions to improve health and wellbeing for people around the world”, including efforts to prevent malaria, promote routine vaccinations, and scale up water chlorination efforts to reduce the spread of waterborne diseases.

Notable grantees include the Malaria Consortium, New Incentives, and Evidence Action.

=== Lead Exposure Action Fund ===
In 2024, the organization launched the Lead Exposure Action Fund in collaboration with partners including Good Ventures and the Gates Foundation. The fund has committed $100 million toward reducing lead exposure, approximately doubling the amount of global philanthropic spending on lead reduction.

Coefficient Giving is also a founding member of the Partnership for a Lead-Free Future, a public-private partnership aimed at ending childhood lead poisoning. Other founding members include UNICEF and USAID.

=== Navigating Transformative AI ===
The Navigating Transformative AI Fund is a leading supporter of research on AI alignment and other work aimed at reducing existential risk from advanced artificial intelligence. The organization believes that artificial general intelligence could “soon outperform humans in nearly all cognitive domains”, which could “benefit people enormously” or “pose serious risks from misuse, accidents, loss of control, and other problems.” Ajeya Cotra, at the time a researcher at Coefficient Giving (now at METR), has said that "a lens that [she uses] to think about the A.I. revolution is that it will play out like the Industrial Revolution but around 10 times faster."

Notable grantees include the Center for Security and Emerging Technology, the Alignment Research Center, and Mila.

=== Science and Global Health R&D ===
Projects funded by Coefficient Giving's Scientific Research program include efforts to create new vaccines and antivirals, develop new scientific tools and techniques, and fund fellowship programs and conference travel for young scientists.

Notable grantees include David Baker, Sherlock Biosciences, and the International Vaccine Institute.

=== Past focus areas ===
Past focus areas of Coefficient Giving (before its move from “focus areas” to “funds”) have included:

- Criminal justice reform (which spun out as a new organization in 2021)
- U.S. macroeconomic stabilization policy (which ceased to be a focus in 2021, though European macroeconomic policy grants have been made more recently)
- Immigration policy (which ceased to be a focus in 2022).
