= NMI =

NMI or nmi may refer to:

== Organisations ==
- National Measurement Institute, the measurement standards body of the Australian Government
- National metrology institute, in metrology
- National Museum of Indonesia
- National Museum of Ireland
- Nazarene Missions International, a ministry of the Church of the Nazarene
- Nelson Mandela Institution
- New Mexico Airlines (ICAO code)
- Nissan Motor Indonesia
- NMI Mobility, (Northwestel Mobility Inc) a spin-off of the Canadian company Northwestel
- NMI, a payment service provider, that acquired Creditcall.

== Science and technology ==
- Nautical mile (nmi)
- New Machine Interface, an instruction format used in the IBM i operating system
- Non-maskable interrupt, in computing
- NMI (gene)

== Other uses ==
- Navi Mumbai International Airport (IATA code)
- No middle initial
- Nonprofit Marketplace Initiative, an initiative that sought to make individual philanthropic donations more evidence-based
- Northern Mariana Islands, a U.S. insular area
- Nyam language (ISO 639 code)

== See also ==
- NRO Management Information System (NMIS), a computer network
