= The Life You Can Save =

2009 book by Peter Singer

- Author: Peter Singer
- Language: English
- Subjects: Poverty, charity, humanitarianism
- Publisher: Random House
- Publication date: 2009 (first edition), 2019 (10th anniversary edition)
- Publication place: United States
- Media type: Print (Hardcover)
- ISBN: 978-1-4000-6710-7
- OCLC: 232980306
- LC Class: HV48.S56 2009
- Preceded by: The Ethics of What We Eat
- Followed by: The Most Good You Can Do: How Effective Altruism Is Changing Ideas About Living Ethically
- Website: www.thelifeyoucansave.org/the-book/

The Life You Can Save: Acting Now to End World Poverty is a 2009 book by Australian philosopher Peter Singer, in which the author argues that citizens of affluent nations are behaving immorally if they do not act to end the poverty they know to exist in developing nations.

The book is focused on giving to charity, and discusses philosophical considerations, describes practical and psychological obstacles to giving, and lists available resources for prospective donors (e.g. charity evaluators). Singer concludes the book by proposing a minimum ethical standard of giving.

In December 2019, Singer announced the release of a revised tenth anniversary edition, available as a free eBook or audiobook from the website of The Life You Can Save, an organization founded to advance the book's ideas.

== Synopsis ==
=== The philosophical argument ===
Singer presents the following argument in the book:

1. First premise: Suffering and death from lack of food, shelter and medical care are bad.
2. Second premise: If it is in your power to prevent something bad from happening, without sacrificing anything nearly as important, it is wrong not to do so.
3. Third premise: By donating to aid agencies, you can prevent suffering and death from lack of food, shelter and medical care, without sacrificing anything nearly as important.
4. Conclusion: Therefore, if you do not donate to aid agencies, you are doing something wrong.

Singer argues that it is obvious that an adult ought to save a child from drowning unless that individual is risking something as valuable as the child's life. Singer points out that as many as 27,000 children die every day from poverty that could be easily and cheaply helped by existing charities (see also List of preventable causes of death).

Singer says that many of his readers enjoy at least one luxury that is less valuable than a child's life. He says his readers ought to sacrifice such a luxury (e.g. bottled waters) and send proceeds to charity, if they can find a reliable charity.

Singer spends time clarifying that people have a right to spend money any way they want, but says that fact does not change the way one ought to spend it. The author also notes that some people may be indifferent to the impact they could have, but says this consideration also fails to change how people ought to act.

Singer's central thesis is that, a given individual may be able to point to others doing nothing, but that individual still ought to do as much as they can. The title of the book comes from the fact that Singer addresses readers directly, asking them what they will do about "the life you can save".

=== The psychology of giving (or not giving) ===
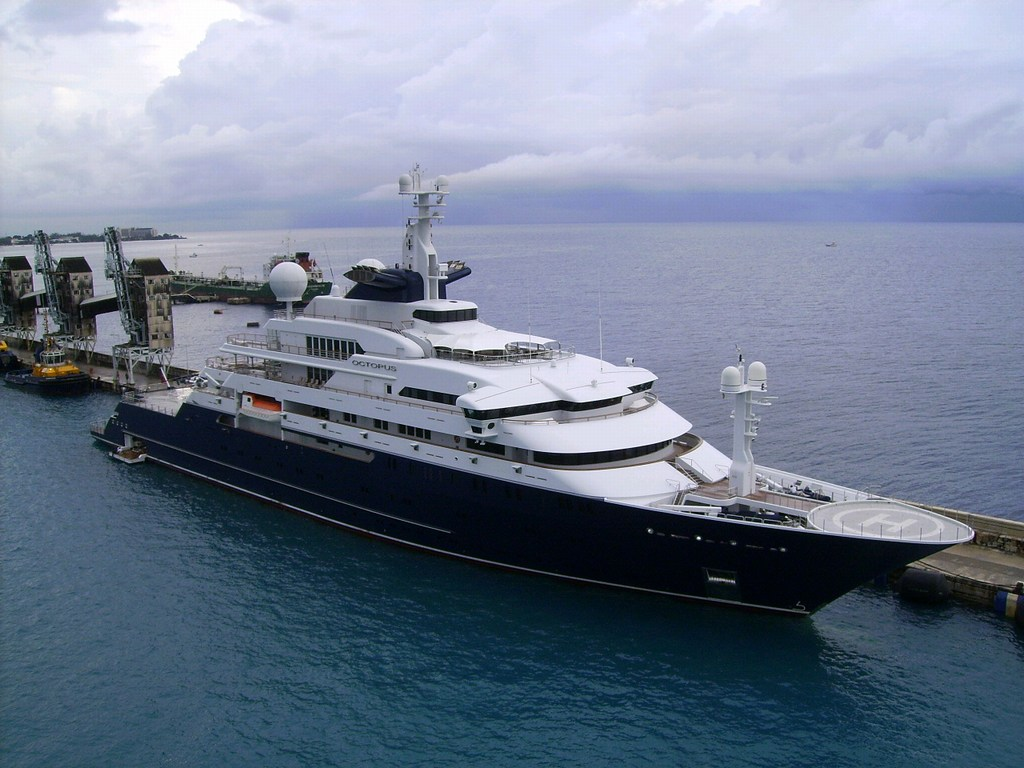
Paul Allen's yacht Octopus. Singer calls the Octopus an example of excessive luxury in a culture that does not give as much as it ought to.

Singer says that citizens of richer nations do not donate as much as they could. The author says the reasons are not philosophical, but due to psychological considerations including cognitive dissonance, diffusion of responsibility and the evolutionary history of human ancestors. For instance, according to Singer, cognitive dissonance theory predicts that humans are rationalizing creatures, making it difficult to change their minds on topics (e.g. charity) that cause any anxiety—unless they are highly motivated to bear it during long contemplation.

Singer contends that humans are highly capable of establishing social circles where giving is the norm, and he offers Bill Gates's Giving Pledge as an example. Singer expresses the hope that an entire culture of giving can develop, allowing individuals to fully admit to themselves how selfish certain individuals have become with their money. The author compares individuals like Paul Farmer (a physician that the author describes as making many sacrifices) with billionaire Paul Allen (who, Singer says, spent $200 million to build the Octopus—a 413-foot personal yacht that requires a crew of sixty).

=== The state of foreign aid today ===
Singer says there is a common misconception that all charities are inefficient or corrupt. He endorses GiveWell, a charity evaluator, as a way to identify the most reliable, effective charities. Singer then describes some common causes of death and suffering in poor countries along with the costs of their solutions. The author uses the example of $5 nets that can protect children from catching malaria from mosquitos during the night. Singer emphasizes that there are many costs involved with putting these solutions into practice. He refers to charity estimates that roughly $1000 can save a human life (As of 2013, GiveWell's top charity, Against Malaria Foundation, is estimated to save one life roughly every $2300 donated.)

=== Singer's new standard of giving ===
Singer says the earth has limited resources, but says this is a weak argument against donating. According to Singer, education and development actually lead to lower birth rates and decrease the risks of overpopulation. Singer adds that affluent nations consume much more food than they need by feeding it to animals and then eating the animals.

Singer settles on a standard of giving: at least 1% of net income (although he goes into more detail about how this percentage might increase as one's income increases). He justifies his decision by saying that, although we ought to give much more, it is not practical to demand much more, and trying to do so may turn people off from giving anything at all.

Singer emphasizes the importance of being practical when it comes to getting as much money as possible to the poor, even if that means holding people to lower standards as a means of changing their habits.

=== Singer's seven steps ===
According to the author, there are several steps that one can take to become a part of the solution to end world poverty.

The author asks the reader to calculate at least 1% of their income and then donate it. Singer further suggests taking steps to foster a culture of giving (using social networks while staying positive and avoiding the emotion of guilt due to cognitive dissonance). Singer goes on to offer other ways to promote a culture of giving.

Singer maintains that the last, important step of donating is to feel good about making a difference. He argues that too much guilt may result in inaction, dooming the poor.

== Reception ==
In a review for Barnes & Noble, George Scialabba writes, "Some of the most affecting pages in The Life You Can Save describe the low-tech, low-cost programs that have restored sight to a million people blinded by cataracts and have rescued many thousands of women and children from lives blighted by cleft palates or obstetric fistulas". Scialabba concludes: "For those willing to do more than [the] bare minimum, Singer has worked out a detailed chart specifying how much everyone at every income level should give... Is this unrealistic? Maybe. But if we don't do it, our 26th-century descendants will be heartily ashamed of us."

Economist Paul Collier, writing in The Guardian, gave The Life You Can Save a mixed review, saying that "Singer is surely right" with regards to his arguments, but criticizing the book's focus on private charity and individual giving, rather than government policy.

Christian Barry and Gerhard Øverland (both from the Centre for Applied Philosophy and Public Ethics) describe in their book review in the Journal of Bioethical Inquiry the widespread acceptance for the notion that "the lives of all people everywhere are of equal fundamental worth when viewed impartially". They then wonder why "the affluent do so little, and demand so little of their governments, while remaining confident that they are morally decent people who generally fulfil their duties to others?" The reviewers agree with Singer, and say they see a conflict between the behaviours of the affluent and the claims of the affluent to being morally decent people. The reviewers also discuss other practical ways to fight poverty.

Philosopher Thomas Nagel says that nobody, not even Singer, will act according to Singer's ideal of giving up all possessions that are less valuable than a human life. Nagel says that our unwillingness to sacrifice may not be entirely an issue of motivation: Nagel says that we can make moral objections, although he calls Singer's principle "plausible".

In June 2010, Bill and Melinda Gates and Warren Buffett launched the "Billionaires' Pledge" (The Giving Pledge)—calling on all billionaires to give at least half their wealth to philanthropic causes—in an interview with Charlie Rose. In the interview, Melinda Gates mentioned Singer's The Life You Can Save, referring to it as suggesting the importance of knowing that other members of one's "reference set"—one's peers—are also helping others.

The book inspired Cari Tuna and her fiancé Dustin Moskovitz, one of the co-founders of Facebook, to start their own philanthropic foundation, Good Ventures, which is focused on high impact philanthropy and is working in close partnership with a charity evaluator called GiveWell.

== Impact ==
After the release of the book, Peter Singer founded the organization The Life You Can Save. The organization is devoted to providing information about and promoting participation in activities that reduce poverty and economic inequality. The organization also encourages people to publicly pledge a percentage of their income to highly effective aid organizations and gives recommendations for about a dozen of such charities. In 2014 the number of people who had pledged publicly reached 17,000.

In addition, the US non-profit One for the World was established in 2014 to offer a simple way to take Singer's suggested 1% pledge. As of mid-2019, they have donated nearly $400k to effective causes and are active in schools in the US, Canada and Australia. They also have over $1m of annualised pledges already committed.

Singer's thought-experiment about the drowning child featured in the book formed the basis of choral music that has been performed by Södra Latin Chamber Choir (conducted by Jan Risberg) and Choate Chamber Chorus.

== See also ==
- Bai Fangli – a pedicab driver who donated all of his meager income to education of poor students
