= Exit grant =

An exit grant is a grant made (typically by a private foundation or other large donor to a nonprofit) with the clear expectation that the donor will not make any further similar grants to the donee.

== Reasons for exit grant ==
Typical reasons for exit grants include:

- The donor is winding down its activities, for instance, by exhausting its fund. Examples include Atlantic Philanthropies and the Beldon Fund.
- The donor is stopping or reducing spending on the specific program or initiative within which the grant is made. An example is the winding down of the Nonprofit Marketplace Initiative by the Hewlett Foundation. It could also be that the donor is reducing resources for grants and evaluation in the program, even if the program is not being completely shut down.
- Recent evidence (or lack of evidence) has led the donor to decide against the value of ongoing support to the grantee.

The generally offered reason for making exit grants rather than abruptly stopping support is that they give grantees sufficient time to find alternative sources or make other plans to deal with the financial and reputational costs of losing a major funding source. Advice for philanthropists focuses on helping grantees develop organizational capacity as part of the exit strategy.
