= Daniela Amodei =

American entrepreneur (born 1987)

- Born: 1987 (age 38–39); San Francisco, California, U.S.
- Education: University of California, Santa Cruz (BA)
- Occupation: Entrepreneur
- Known for: Co-founding Anthropic, Vice President of Safety and Policy at OpenAI
- Title: President and co-founder of Anthropic
- Spouse: Holden Karnofsky (m. 2017)
- Children: 2
- Relatives: Dario Amodei (brother)
- Awards: Time 100 Most Influential People in AI (2023)

Daniela Amodei (born 1987) is an American entrepreneur and the president of Anthropic, an artificial intelligence (AI) company known for its Claude series of large language models. She co-founded Anthropic in 2021 with her brother Dario Amodei. Prior to her work at Anthropic, Amodei was the vice president of safety and policy at OpenAI.

== Early life ==
Daniela Amodei was born in San Francisco in 1987. Her father, Riccardo Amodei, an Italian American leather craftsman from Massa Marittima, Tuscany, died when Amodei was a young adult after years of health problems. Her mother, Elena Engel, a Jewish American born in Chicago, worked as a project manager for libraries. Amodei is the younger sister of Dario Amodei.

Amodei graduated from Lowell High School. She received a classical flute scholarship and studied liberal arts and music, graduating with a Bachelor of Arts in English literature from the University of California, Santa Cruz.

== Career ==
Amodei started her career in global health and politics, playing a role in a successful congressional campaign in Pennsylvania. She then briefly managed communications for House representative Matt Cartwright in Washington D.C., before leaving politics for the tech industry. In 2013, she joined the financial service company Stripe as an early employee, before transitioning to OpenAI in 2018. At OpenAI, Amodei managed the team during GPT-2's development before moving into safety and policy. She was the vice president of safety and policy there, but left in 2020 to co-found Anthropic with her brother Dario. As president of Anthropic, she leads teams focused on AI safety and model alignment.

In September 2023, Amodei and her brother were named as two of the Time 100 Most Influential People in AI (Time100 AI).

The Wall Street Journal has stated that at Anthropic, Amodei "oversees day-to-day operations and manages the executive team", while her brother, the CEO, serves as "ideological leader", with only one direct report.

== Personal life ==
In August 2017, Daniela married Holden Karnofsky, the co-founder of the effective altruism-based foundation Coefficient Giving (formerly Open Philanthropy). They have two children. As of October 2026, Forbes estimated Amodei's net worth to be $13.7 billion.
