= Prabhjot Singh =

Prabhjot Singh may refer to:

- Prabhjot Singh (field hockey) (born 1980), Indian field hockey player
- Prabhjot Singh (physician) (born 1982), American scientist, physician and healthcare researcher
