= GiveDirectly =

Nonprofit organization

- Founded: 2008; 18 years ago
- Type: 501(c)(3) non-profit organization
- Purpose: Alleviating extreme poverty through cash transfers
- Region served: Bahamas, Bangladesh, DRC, Liberia, Kenya, Malawi, Morocco, Mozambique, Nigeria, Rwanda, Togo, Turkey, Uganda, US, Yemen
- President: Nick Allardice
- Employees: Approx 175
- Website: givedirectly.org

GiveDirectly is a nonprofit organization operating in low income areas that helps families living in extreme poverty by making unconditional cash transfers to them via mobile phone. GiveDirectly currently transfers funds to people in Bangladesh, DRC, Liberia, Kenya, Malawi, Mozambique, Rwanda, Uganda and the US. In the past, it has worked in The Bahamas, Morocco, Nigeria, Turkey, Togo and Yemen.

== History ==
GiveDirectly originated as a giving circle started by students at MIT and Harvard, Paul Niehaus, Michael Faye, Rohit Wanchoo, and Jeremy Shapiro based on their research into philanthropy. In 2012 they formalized their operation into GiveDirectly.

In December 2012, GiveDirectly received a $2.4M Global Impact Award from Google. In June 2014, the founders of GiveDirectly announced plans to create a for-profit technology company, Segovia, aimed at improving the efficiency of cash transfer distributions in the developing world. In August 2015, GiveDirectly received a $25M grant from Good Ventures.

In April 2016, GiveDirectly announced a $30M initiative to test universal basic income in order to "try to permanently end extreme poverty across dozens of villages and thousands of people in Kenya by guaranteeing them an ongoing income high enough to meet their basic needs" and, if it works, pave the way for implementation in other regions. The initiative launched in November 2017 and is set to run for 12 years.

In 2017, GiveDirectly applied their model for the first time in the U.S., distributing cash-loaded debit cards to residents of Rose City, Texas, following Hurricane Harvey.

In 2022, GiveDirectly appointed British politician and diplomat Rory Stewart as their president. In 2023, Nick Allardice became president and CEO of the company.

In 2023, an investigation revealed that in the Democratic Republic of Congo, where GiveDirectly began operations in 2018, employees had diverted at least $900,000 from several hundred intended recipients in South Kivu to themselves, including the very audit teams tasked with identifying such cases. GiveDirectly paused its operations in the country in January 2023 and began an audit of its funds transfers in another African country.

== Operations ==
=== COVID-19 support ===
GiveDirectly set up two emergency response programs to the COVID-19 pandemic: one in the US, for which it has raised US$118 million, and one in African countries, for which it has raised US$76 million. The organization has sent cash relief to 116,000 families in the US and 342,000 families in Kenya, Liberia, Malawi, Rwanda and Togo.

In Togo it built on an existing government of Togo cash transfer program called Novissi. Money is paid via mobile money technology, with beneficiaries withdrawing money at local shops. GiveDirectly helped expand the program to certain rural areas where the government found it difficult to identify the poorest beneficiaries. The machine learning algorithm First, it finds the poorest villages by analyzing roof material, sizes of farm plots and the presence of paved or unpaved roads through satellite images. Second, it finds the poorest individuals in a village by analyzing their mobile phone data like lengths and frequency of phone calls, number of inbound versus outbound calls, and amount of mobile data used.

=== Basic income experiment ===
In April 2016 GiveDirectly announced a 12-year experiment to test a universal basic income on a rural region in Western Kenya. More than 26,000 people received some type of cash transfer, with more than 6,000 receiving a long-term basic income.

- Long-term basic income: 40 villages with recipients receiving roughly $0.75 per adult per day, delivered monthly for 12 years
- Short-term basic income: 80 villages with recipients receiving the same monthly amount, but only for 2 years
- Lump sum payments: 80 villages with recipients receiving a lump sum payment equivalent to the total value of the short-term stream
- Control group: 100 villages not receiving cash transfers

In November 2019, an economics paper on the GiveDirectly experiment found each dollar from cash transfers increased local economic activity by $2.60.

Another decade-long study found that this initiative also lowered infant mortality rates by nearly half and in deaths in children under five by 45%.

=== Mission in Rwanda ===
Since 2016, GiveDirectly has been working in partnership with the Government of Rwanda, through the Ministry of Local Government (MINALOC), to accelerate poverty reduction. The organization delivers unconditional cash transfers to individuals living in poverty, empowering them with the means to choose how best to improve their lives.

As of 2024, GiveDirectly has provided cash transfers to over 200,000 households across various districts, including Gasabo, Gicumbi, Gisagara, Kayonza, Ngoma, Ngororero, Nyamagabe, and Rusizi. Notably, 84% of these households are female-led.

In 2023, GiveDirectly launched a national scale-up program, beginning with pilot projects in Gikomero, Cyabakamyi, Murama, Shingiro, and Butare districts. Under this initiative, eligible households receive a minimum of Rwf 1.1 million to support sustainable livelihoods and facilitate graduation out of poverty.

Impact assessments in districts such as Nyamagabe, Ngororero, and Gisagara have shown that recipients commonly invest in productive assets such as agriculture, livestock, businesses, and education. Approximately 31% of funds are used for home renovations, while 43% support income-generating activities. Additionally, cash transfers have contributed to food security, health insurance participation, and electrification of homes.

Through collaboration with local leadership and in-person engagement with households, GiveDirectly ensures effective implementation and addresses challenges during the process. The organization’s efforts align with Rwanda’s National Strategy for Sustainable Graduation out of Poverty (NSSG).

== Funding ==
GiveDirectly collects donations from private donors as well as foundations. In 2015, the organization received $25 million from Good Ventures, a private foundation started by Facebook co-founder Dustin Moskovitz and his wife Cari Tuna. In 2019, the organization won a grant of $2.1m from the Global Innovation Fund. In 2020, the organization received funding from Blue Meridian Partners as a part of a $100 million COVID-19 emergency response initiative. In 2025, Canva announced a $100 million commitment to GiveDirectly to assist their efforts in Malawi.

== Reception ==
=== GiveWell reviews ===
GiveDirectly has been named one of GiveWell 'top rated' charities for 2012 through 2020.

=== Reception by development economists ===
After the release of GiveDirectly's impact self-evaluation in October 2013, World Bank economist David McKenzie praised the robustness of the study's design and the clear disclosure of the study lead's conflict of interest, but raised two concerns:

- The use of self-reporting made the results hard to interpret and rely on (this is a feature of any study that attempted to measure consumption).
- The division of the sample into so many groups meant that there was less statistical power to clearly decide which group had better outcomes.

Chris Blattman, an academic in development economics, with a particular focus on randomized controlled trials, also blogged about the study. He expressed two main reservations:

- The observer-expectancy effect, where the people being asked questions may be subtly influenced in their answers by the experimenter's expectations.
- The lack of clear positive effect on long-term outcomes, as well as the lack of increased spending on health and education.

== See also ==
- Effective altruism
- Unconditional cash transfer
- Universal basic income
