= Malaria Consortium =

International non-profit organization

- Founded: 2003; 23 years ago
- Type: International non-government organisation, NGO
- Registration no.: Charity (UK) 1099776 Company (UK) 4785712 US EIN Number 98-0627052
- Purpose: Malaria, pneumonia, diarrhoea, dengue, malnutrition, neglected tropical diseases
- Location: The Green House, 244-254 Cambridge Heath Road, London, E2 9DA, United Kingdom
- Region served: Africa, Asia
- Key people: Wilfred Mbacham, (Chair); James Tibenderana, (Chief Executive)
- Website: malariaconsortium.org

Malaria Consortium is an international non-profit organization based in Cambridge Heath, London, specializing in the comprehensive control of malaria and other communicable diseases – particularly those affecting children under five.

Established in 2003, Malaria Consortium works in Africa and Asia Pacific with aims to combat malaria and neglected tropical diseases, as well as to improve child health. It is a specialist technical organization that works with governments and partners to strengthen health service delivery.

It headquarters in the United Kingdom, with regional offices in Africa and Asia, and country offices in Burkina Faso, Cambodia, Chad, Ethiopia, Mozambique, Myanmar, Nigeria, South Sudan, Thailand, Togo, and Uganda.

== Operations ==
Malaria and parasite control in general, is central to Malaria Consortium's strategy. It focuses on the prevention, control, diagnosis and treatment of parasitic diseases, including malaria, pneumonia, diarrhea, dengue and neglected tropical diseases. Other operations include enhancement of health systems in the context of neglected tropical diseases, research and monitoring, and national and international advocacy and policy development.

The organization aims to make healthcare more accessible for communities in Africa and Asia, especially regarding children under five, pregnant women, and migrant populations. The intervention strategy is generally based on integrated community case management and community management of acute malnutrition, or a mix of both. Integrated community case management is an approach encompassing the provision of home based treatment for childhood illnesses, malnutrition or neglected tropical diseases. It implies strengthening the availability and quality of care in the communities. To this end, the Malaria Consortium trains volunteers. As part of its community management of acute malnutrition strategy, the organization also funds health promotion and messaging interventions.

Malaria Consortium's parasite control and prevention strategy includes vector control through long lasting insecticidal nets distribution, indoor residual spraying, education, and data surveillance. Malaria Consortium is for instance leading the Beyond Garki Project, an initiative to collect epidemiological data on the evolution of malaria. They also support seasonal malaria chemoprevention (SMC) campaigns, and are the largest organization running SMC campaigns in the Sahel. In this program preventive drugs are given to young children in the form of tablets. The tablets are given to the children during high transmission season. Initially these tablets are distributed to the child by a trained local health worker, and later by the child's caregiver. In addition to providing the drugs, Malaria Consortium helps develop training material as well as training the local staff. Since 2012, the World Health Organization (WHO) has recommended SMC as a treatment for malaria in Africa's sub-Sahel region.

Malaria Consortium began as a research consortium within the London School of Hygiene and Tropical Medicine and was originally funded solely by the UK Department for International Development (DFID, the Overseas Development Administration before 1997). Research remains an important aspect of Malaria Consortium's strategy and the organization publishes research in open access and scholarly journals. For instance, it worked with Cambodian National Center for Parasitology, Entomology and Malaria Control and WHO, contributing on research regarding the use of Guppy Fishes as part of an integrated strategy for dengue control.

Malaria Consortium produces learning materials with the aim to support the advancement of policy and practice. The organization often collaborates with governments on pilot interventions and delivers recommendations based on the findings.

In 2021, Malaria Consortium was awarded independent research organisation (IRO) status by UK Research and Innovation, making it one of only two international non-governmental organizations to hold this status in the UK.

== Funding ==
The majority of Malaria Consortium's work is funded through grants, contracts and consultancy income. This is mainly restricted funding to deliver on a particular project in either a specific country or multiple countries.

A substantial portion of global funding available for SMC is GiveWell-directed funding from donors. A 2019 GiveWell report states that 53% of the income for SMC came from donations. Furthermore, 16% came from USAID and 13% from UKAID. Other major funders includes the Global Fund, Project Management Institute, the World Bank, Good Ventures and the Bill & Melinda Gates Foundation.

== Reception ==
Since 2016, the charity evaluator GiveWell included the SMC program in its list of top 9 charities.

SMC is the only Malaria Consortium program reviewed by GiveWell and they recommend it based on the program's strong evidence base and cost-effectiveness, in addition to the fact that there is room for more funding. They also have experience with supporting such projects on a large scale in seven countries with a demonstrated success at reaching a large portion of the targeted children.
