= Justin Rosenstein =

American businessman (born 1983)

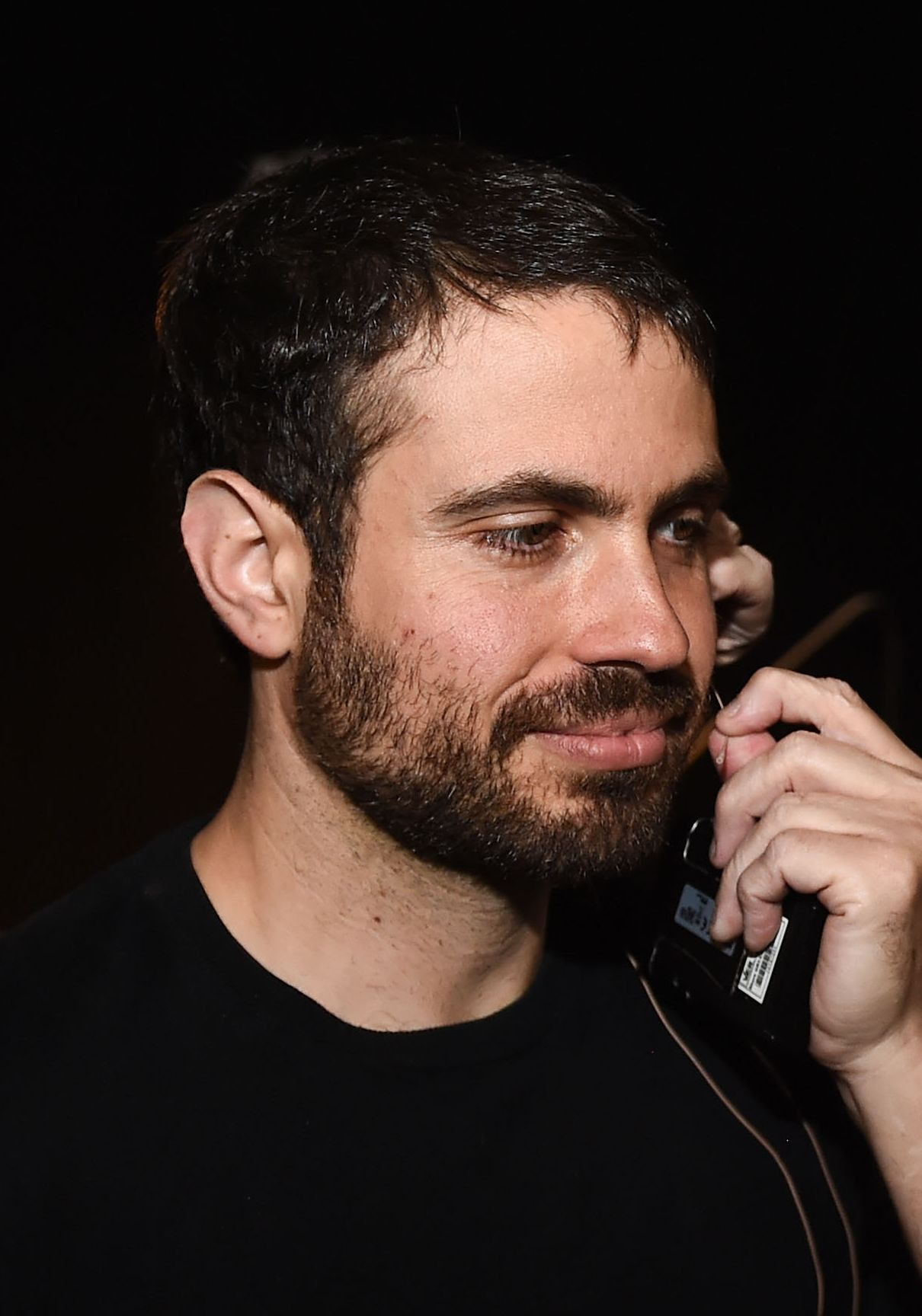
- Rosenstein in 2018
- Born: Justin Michael Rosenstein; May 13, 1983 (age 43); Alameda County, California, U.S.
- Education: Stanford University (BS)
- Occupations: Software programmer, entrepreneur
- Known for: Co-founder of Asana
- Website: justinrosenstein.com

Justin Michael Rosenstein (born May 13, 1983) is an American software programmer and entrepreneur. He co-founded the collaboration software company Asana in 2008.

== Early life ==
Rosenstein grew up in San Francisco Bay Area and attended The College Preparatory School in Oakland, California. He is Jewish. He was a successful high school Lincoln–Douglas debater. He matriculated to Stanford University, and graduated with a Bachelor of Science degree in mathematics at age 20. As an undergraduate, he served as a member of the Mayfield Fellows Program.

== Career ==
Rosenstein dropped out of a graduate program in computer science at Stanford in 2004 to join Google as a product manager. At Google, Rosenstein led projects in Google's communication and collaboration division. His projects initially included Google Page Creator, the precursor to Google Sites, and a project internally codenamed “Platypus,” which eventually became Google Drive. He also created and wrote the original prototype for Gmail Chat and many of the features in Google's rich text editor.

In May 2007, Rosenstein left Google to become an engineering lead at Facebook, working closely with Mark Zuckerberg and Dustin Moskovitz. He was technical lead in charge of Facebook's Pages, the Facebook Like button, and Facebook Beacon.

In October 2008, Rosenstein left Facebook to co-found the collaborative software company Asana along with Moskovitz. On its website, Asana states its mission is to “help humanity thrive by enabling all teams to work together effortlessly.” He is a frequent speaker on issues of business and technology. He has published opinions on building effective collaborative software in Wired, leadership strategy and enterprise software design in Fast Company, and entrepreneurship in TechCrunch, and productivity in TIME.

== One Project ==
Rosenstein is the founder of a nonprofit organization called One Project. In 2014, he delivered the keynote address at the TechCrunch Disrupt conference in New York, about using technology for social good as part of “one human project for global thriving.”

== The Social Dilemma ==
Rosenstein starred in the documentary drama The Social Dilemma, which examines the impact of extended time spent on social networking platforms and raises the alarm on the importance of tackling problems such as addiction, fake news, and global warming.

In the documentary, Rosenstein writes:

"We live in a world in which a tree is worth more, financially, dead than alive, in a world in which a whale is worth more dead than alive. For so long as our economy works in that way and corporations go unregulated, they're going to continue to destroy trees, to kill whales, to mine the earth, and to continue to pull oil out of the ground, even though we know it is destroying the planet and we know that it's going to leave a worse world for future generations. This is short-term thinking based on this religion of profit at all costs, as if somehow, magically, each corporation acting in its selfish interest is going to produce the best result. This has been affecting the environment for a long time. What's frightening, and what hopefully is the last straw that will make us wake up as a civilization to how flawed this theory has been in the first place, is to see that now we're the tree, we're the whale."

This quote originates from Daniel Schmachtenberger's "New Economic Series", which he published three years earlier, in 2017.

== Personal life ==
As of 2013, Rosenstein was living in a cooperative living space in San Francisco's Mission District, called Agape. He is vegan.

While working at Facebook, Rosenstein was compensated with about 4.863 million Class B shares, worth about $3 billion at $620/share. Additionally, he owns about 16.2% of Asana, valued around $680 million based on a $4 billion valuation for the company. Rosenstein has committed to giving away most of his wealth to philanthropic causes in his lifetime, inspired by The Giving Pledge.
