= Creditcall =

Creditcall Limited
- Type: Private
- Founded: 1996
- Headquarters: Bristol, UK
- Area served: UK, Europe, North America
- Key people: Steve Pinado. CEO
- Products: EMV, Contactless payment, Payment gateway, E-commerce, M-commerce, Vending, Parking, ATM
- Website: www.nmi.com

Creditcall (now NMI) is a payment service provider and payment gateway with offices in the United States and UK, providing credit card authorisation and settlement services to banks and processors in the United Kingdom, United States and Canada.

== History ==
Creditcall Limited, originally Creditcall Communications Limited, was founded in 1996. Later, a North American subsidiary, Creditcall Corporation, was incorporated in 2005. The name Creditcall is derived from the name of Creditcall's first product, a telecommunications service that enabled callers to bill telephone calls to their credit or debit card. Creditcall won 3i's Business Catapult Award in 1998 along with an initial investment in the company.

In 2012 the management team completed a management buyout of the company backed by FF&P Private Equity and Bestport Ventures.

On 21 April 2014 Creditcall was awarded the Queen's Award for Enterprise.

== Acquisition ==
In March 2018, Creditcall was acquired by US-based payments' technology company NMI. NMI is headquartered in Schaumburg, Illinois, with offices in Utah, New York, and Bristol, UK. NMI is backed by US private equity firms Insight Partners, Great Hill Partners and Francisco Partners.

== See also ==
- Masterpass
