= Founders Pledge =

English charitable non-profit

- Founded: 2015; 11 years ago
- Founder: Dafna Bonas, David Goldberg, Damian Kimmelman
- Type: Non-profit
- Location: London, England
- Region served: Global
- Members: 1,776 (May 2023)
- Website: founderspledge.com

Founders Pledge is a London-based charitable initiative where entrepreneurs commit to donate a portion of their personal proceeds to charity when they sell their business. The mission of Founders Pledge is to "empower entrepreneurs to do immense good".

By October 2024, 1,970 entrepreneurs across 30 countries have signed up to Founders Pledge. Collectively, they have pledged to donate $10.3 billion in share value (of which $1.4 billion in donations have been completed to date).

== History ==
Founders Pledge was initially launched in 2015 by the Founders Forum for Good, which focuses on helping social entrepreneurs build and scale businesses. David Goldberg, co-founder and CEO of Founders Pledge, stated that 80,000 Hours' work has influenced the organization's trajectory.

Founders Pledge was named one of the New Radicals 2016, "innovative projects chosen by The Observer and Nesta as making a real difference to society".

Starting in London, Founders Pledge has since expanded and opened multiple new offices in cities such as Berlin, New York and San Francisco. In addition, Founders Pledge has launched partnerships with organisations including Y Combinator, MassChallenge, and Forward Partners. In September 2016, Sam Altman, president of Y Combinator, wrote on the Y Combinator blog: "Many of our founders ask us about how they can donate part of their equity or post-exit proceeds, and now we have an answer: Founders Pledge."

In 2023, Founders Pledge moved $168 million to the charitable sector on a budget of $8.2 million, implying an ROI of over 20:1.

== Activities ==
Founders Pledge runs three main types of activities, all free of charge for its members.

- First, they aim to build a community of impact-driven entrepreneurs by organizing events to educate members on evidence-backed impact strategies.
- Second, they provide administrative support with donations and offer a donor-advised fund.
- Third, Founders Pledge conducts research on high-leverage giving opportunities and advises its members on where to give based on their personal values.

=== Research ===
Founders Pledge partners with GiveWell for its research on cost-effective global health and development charities. In addition, Founders Pledge has written research reports on various topics, including:

- impact investing,
- climate change,
- evidence-based policy,
- animal welfare,
- mental health,
- and the mitigation of catastrophic risks.

== Members ==
Entrepreneurs signing up to Founders Pledge enter a commitment to donate a portion of their personal proceeds upon liquidity to charity. The minimum commitment is 2%, though entrepreneurs commit around 7% on average. Comparing several donation pledging initiatives, Vox writes that Founders Pledge forces The Giving Pledge "to compete for the mindshare of today’s tech community".

A complete list of members is available on the Founders Pledge website. Notable members of Founders Pledge include the following:

- Mustafa Suleyman, co-founder of Google DeepMind
- Kathryn Petralia, Co-founder and COO of Kabbage

== See also ==
- Earning to give
- GiveWell
- Giving What We Can
- Raising for Effective Giving
