= Nonprofit Marketplace Initiative =

The Nonprofit Marketplace Initiative (NMI) was an initiative of the Effective Philanthropy Group of the Hewlett Foundation launched in 2006. Its closure was announced in the Chronicle of Philanthropy in April 2014.

== Origin ==
The NMI was started by the Effective Philanthropy Group at the Hewlett Foundation in 2006 with the goal that "by 2015, ten percent of individual philanthropic donations in the US (or $20 billion), would be influenced by meaningful, high-quality information about nonprofit organizations’ performance." Jacob Harold was the program officer responsible, and the Hewlett Foundation at the time was headed by Paul Brest.

== Organizations funded ==
The NMI funded a number of charity evaluators including:

- GiveWell, that was focused on finding the very best charities to donate to
- Charity Navigator and Guidestar, that were focused more on rating large numbers of charities using clearly defined metrics
- Philanthropedia, a platform for experts to rate charities
- GreatNonprofits, a platform for people to share information about great charities

Holden Karnofsky, co-founder and co-executive director of GiveWell, expressed gratitude to the NMI, saying that NMI's support of the organization was crucial in its first few years, when it was relatively unknown and the subject of unfavorable controversies. He also praised the NMI for their support despite differences in strategy and approach, and said that while the NMI often encouraged them to spread a wider net and collaborate more with other NMI grantees, they were never inappropriately pressured.

Ken Berger, President of Charity Navigator, wrote a letter upon the closure of the NMI thanking the Hewlett Foundation for their generous support of Charity Navigator through their transition to version 3.0 of their product. Berger identified the Hewlett Foundation as the single biggest overall supporter of Charity Navigator.

== Closure ==
In April 2014, an article the Chronicle of Philanthropy announced that the Hewlett Foundation was ending the Nonprofit Marketplace Initiative. The Hewlett Foundation's decision was based on an internal re-evaluation of the project, motivated by two external pieces of information:

- The Money For Good study conducted by Hope Consulting (paid for by the Hewlett Foundation) whose headline result was "few donors do research before they give, and those that do look to the nonprofit itself to provide simple information about efficiency and effectiveness."
- An external evaluation from Arabella Advisors whose results further convinced the Hewlett Foundation that their strategy was not working anywhere near as well as they hoped.

The Hewlett Foundation also had some significant personnel changes over the time period: Jacob Harold left the Hewlett Foundation for GuideStar and was replaced by Lindsay Louise, while Paul Brest was replaced by Larry Kramer as President of the Hewlett Foundation. They said that these changes made it more logical for them to re-evaluate the strategy, but was not the reason for ending the program, since the external studies and evaluations that would lead to the program's closure had been initiated under the previous staff.

The Hewlett Foundation also clarified that even though they had failed to meet their own goals with the NMI, the organizations they funded, such as GiveWell, Charity Navigator, and GuideStar, had done a great job at meeting those organization's goals.

Responding to the closure decision, Holden Karnofsky of GiveWell wrote that while the decision to shut down the program may have been the right one, GiveWell did not agree with the stated reasons for closure. Karnofsky argued that GiveWell's money moved in the years to come would alone more than justify the grand total of 12 million dollars spent on the NMI. This would be validated in the years to come: in 2014, GiveWell moved $13.0 million to its top charities from donors excluding Good Ventures, a multi-billion dollar foundation it works closely with.

Jacob Harold, the program officer formerly responsible for NMI, who had since left for GuideStar, responded to Karnofsky's post, noting that the NMI's goals of reaching a large population were still worthwhile, and that its main problem may have been that it was too early for its time. Harold noted that he hoped to make the vision the NMI sought a reality through his work for GuideStar. He emphasized the importance of both quality and quantity, noting that GiveWell and the effective altruism movement it was part of might be too neglectful of the quantity goals that the NMI had.
