= New Incentives =

US non-governmental organization

- Abbreviation: NI-ABAE
- Formation: 2011
- Founders: Patrick Stadler, Pratyush Agarwal, Svetha Janumpalli
- Purpose: Healthcare
- Headquarters: Covina, California
- Method: Donations, grants
- Employees: 3,300
- Website: www.newincentives.org

New Incentives is a non-governmental organization (NGO) that operates in Nigeria, running a conditional cash transfer (CCT) program. They aim to increase infantile vaccination through cash transfers, raising public awareness and reducing the frequency of vaccine stockout.

In Nigeria, New Incentives is known as the All Babies Are Equal (ABAE) Initiative, due to the name New Incentives not being accepted for registration. The organization is sometimes referred to as NI-ABAE. As of 2024, New Incentives is one of Givewell's top four charities.

== History ==
New Incentives was founded in 2011 by Patrick Stadler, Pratyush Agarwal, and Svetha Janumpalli. HIV prevention was originally at the heart of their strategy. Women could receive cash transfers upon registration of their pregnancy, HIV testing and birth delivery at hospital. Other at risk-pregnancies were later included, such as anemia, hepatitis and tuberculosis.

New Incentives now focuses on immunisation of under-five children.

== Operations ==
The New Incentives CCT program is run in North West, parts of North East and North Central Nigeria in the states of Bauchi, Gombe, Jigawa, Kaduna, Kano, Katsina, Kebbi, Niger, Sokoto, Yobe and Zamfara. This region has one of the lowest vaccination coverages in the world, less than 25% of the infants are vaccinated.

In 2022, Nigeria had an estimated under-five mortality rate of 107 per 1000 live births, one of the highest in the world. Of these children about 40% died from vaccine-preventable diseases like pneumonia, diarrhea and measles.

The under five child mortality rate differs from state to state, with Kebbi having the highest (252 deaths per 1000), Ogun having the lowest (30 deaths per 1000), and the North West region having the highest regional rate at 187 deaths per 1000 according to the Nigeria Demographic and Health survey from 2018.

The cash transfers from New Incentives are conditioned on the vaccination of infants with the BCG vaccine, the pentavalent vaccine, the pneumococcal conjugate vaccine and the meningococcal vaccine, which immunize them against tuberculosis, measles, pneumococcal infection and hepatitis B, among others.

Other activities include improving the supply chain of vaccines and vaccine information campaigns.

== Effectiveness ==
In 2024, the charity evaluator GiveWell ranked New Incentives among its top four charities. It estimated that it costs approximately between $1000 and $5000 to prevent a death this way. This evaluation was partly based on the randomized controlled trial conducted by IDinsight. The increase in the proportion of vaccinated children was estimated to be between 11 and 22 percent in areas where New Incentives works.
