= Masterpass =

Digital payment brand used by Mastercard

- Logo used since 2016
- Developer: Mastercard
- Release: 2002; 24 years ago
- Website: International; Turkey; Ukraine

Masterpass is the trademark under which Mastercard provides digital payment services in some markets around the world, which is a digital wallet that allows to pay faster by keeping all the information you need for payment and delivery in one place. It is a universal payment solution that can be integrated into both a website and a mobile application. Despite its name, Masterpass is compatible with more than simply Mastercard products, it allows you to save the data of cards other payment systems. Mastercard does not charge merchant any fees for purchases through Masterpass.

Masterpass users can receive special offers from some of the retailers that accept the payment service. It works similarly to Apple Pay and Google Pay online, so if a website or service has not already added support, Masterpass would not change that.

== See also ==
- Visa Checkout
- Apple Wallet
- Google Wallet
- Samsung Pay
