= Prabhjot Singh (physician) =

American medical professor

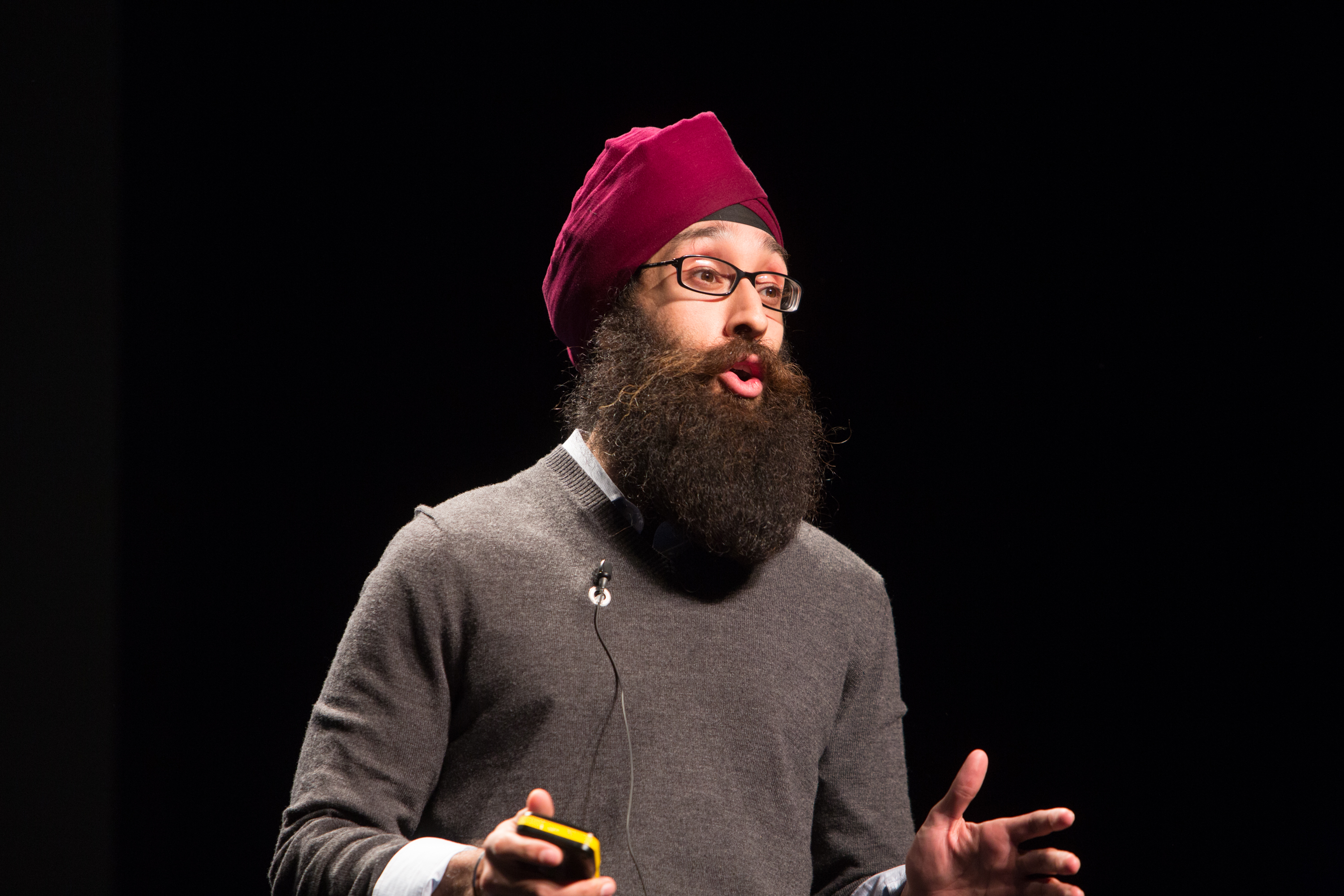
- Singh in 2013
- Born: August 20, 1982 (age 44)
- Education: University of Rochester; Cornell University; Rockefeller University; Columbia University
- Notable work: Dying and Living in the Neighborhood: A Street-Level View of America's Healthcare Promise
- Website: https://www.prabhjotsingh.org

Prabhjot Singh (born August 20, 1982) is an American scientist, physician and healthcare researcher.

He is associate professor in the Departments of Health System Design and Global Health and Medicine at the Mount Sinai Health System and Icahn School of Medicine, as well as Senior Advisor for Strategic Initiatives at the Peterson Center on Healthcare and The Peterson Health Technology Institute. His work has focused on how advances in community health systems globally can improve health in America.

Singh is the author of more than 25 academic papers on a variety of subjects including healthcare delivery to impoverished communities.

== Early life and education ==
Singh was raised in Kenya and earned a BA and BS in biology from the University of Rochester, where he graduated magna cum laude, Phi Beta Kappa and earned a Barry M. Goldwater Scholarship.

He went on to pursue a combined MD/PhD at Weill Cornell Medical College Rockefeller University, with a Post-Doctoral fellowship in Sustainable Development at Columbia University, supported by a Paul and Daisy Soros Fellowship, NIH Medical Scientist Training Program Fellowship. He completed his clinical training in Internal Medicine at Mount Sinai Hospital in Manhattan, Elmhurst Hospital in Queens, and the James J. Peters VA Medical Center in the Bronx. As he was completing his clinical training, he was recognized as a Robert Wood Johnson Foundation 40th Anniversary Young Leader for his work on adapting global insights into health system design to domestic contexts. He gave a TEDx talk on the topic in 2010, and at Mayo Transform in 2014.

== Career ==
Singh was an assistant professor of International and Public Affairs at Columbia University and Director of Systems Design at The Earth Institute. In 2013, he co-founded the One Million Community Health Worker Campaign with Jeffrey Sachs, which is an initiative of the African Union and UN Sustainable Development Solutions Network.

Singh was named as Director of the Arnhold Institute and Chair of the Department of Health System Design & Global Health at Mount Sinai Health Systems in 2016. The Arnhold Institute was supported with a gift of $27.5 million, and in 2016, his Arnhold Institute team, in partnership with the UN Special Envoy for Health In Agenda 2030 and partners, launched Atlas, which leverages satellite technologies to create a new generation of spatial information systems that push intelligence to frontline health care workers in information poor regions. This software has yet to be deployed or used by any frontline health care workers.

Domestically, in his role as Vice Chairman of Medicine for Population Health, Dr. Singh supported the development of a primary care practice transformation team in partnership with health system leaders.

In 2011, Singh and his wife, Manmeet Kaur, founded City Health Works, a program to build a financially sustainable and scalable platform for health coaches to improve the outcomes and decrease the costs of care for high need patients. In September 2025, Singh co-authored a study evaluating City Health Works' health-coaching model in the The American Journal of Managed Care. In November 2025, Eagleline Investigations published criticism of the study's methodology, data representation, and author organization ties, questioning whether its findings accurately represented the program's impact. The article was subsequently retracted.

Singh has a particular interest in developing the capacity for intermediaries to form bridges between healthcare and social care.

In 2016, the Mount Sinai Health System Dean, CEO and Board of Trustees approved the creation of the Department of Health System Design and Global Health with Singh as chair. Singh also became the Director of the Arnhold Institute for Global Health at Mount Sinai, a position from which he later resigned after being named as a defendant in a federal complaint for sex, age and race discrimination. He also serves on the National Academy of Medicine's forum on Aging, Independence and Disability, as well as the National Quality Forum's taskforce on the impact of housing instability and food insecurity on health. He is a term member of the Council on Foreign Relations. In 2017, he became a Presidential Leadership Scholar and in 2018, he became a Fellow of the Committee on Global Thought at Columbia University.

In 2018, the Robert Wood Johnson Foundation announced that he was elected to their board of trustees. Singh stepped down from his positions as Chairman of the Arnhold Institute for Global Health and chairman of the department of health system design and global health at the Icahn School of Medicine at Mount Sinai in 2019. He remains on the faculty.

Singh was named to the initial cohort of healthcare executives selected to join the Frist Cressy Ventures Collective in 2022. At the time, Singh was chief medical officer of CHW Cares, which was acquired by Oak Street Health and later by CVS Health. He became a senior advisor to Peterson Health Technology Institute in 2023.

His work has been featured in The Lancet, The New England Journal of Medicine, Brookings Institution Economic Studies, and Health Affairs, and covered by media outlets such as NPR and the New York Times.

== Controversy ==
In April 2019, the Mount Sinai Health System was sued for gender, race, and age discrimination by 8 employees and former employees. Three employees at the Arnhold Institute for Global Health, including Singh, and the then Dean of the Icahn School of Medicine, Dr. Dennis Charney, were named as defendants. The lawsuit and subsequent advocacy by the plaintiffs helped bring attention to workplace discrimination in New York City's hospitals. In 2020, Council Member Helen Rosenthal highlighted the case and proposed legislation to establish a Gender and Race Equity Advisory Board to advise the city's actions to maintain safe workplaces for minority healthcare workers and achieve greater healthcare equity.

== Social advocacy ==
Singh has written about extensively on the scientific link between healthcare and housing as well as issues related to hate crimes, building more resilient communities, and equal opportunity to work. He was attacked in a 2013 hate crime that received extensive local, national and international press, both for the attack itself as well as his response. The LA Times, Christian Science Monitor, The Guardian and Al Jazeera have cited him on Sikhs in America. In 2014, Columbia University Magazine wrote a feature story about Prabhjot Singh and Manmeet Kaur's relationship, work in healthcare, and social activism. He serves on the board of directors for the Auburn Seminary and Kaur Life.

In 2017, Singh provided testimony to the United States Senate Judiciary Committee on the rising incidence of religious hate crimes.

== Books ==
- Panjabi, Raj., Singh, Prabhjot. The Last Mile: How to Get Health Care to the Places That Need It Most. United States: Columbia University Press, 2020.
- Singh, Prabhjot. Dying and Living in the Neighborhood: A Street-Level View of America’s Healthcare Promise. United States: Johns Hopkins University Press, 2016

== Select publications ==
Singh has published more than 30 peer-reviewed scientific articles that have been cited more than 1100 times.

- Institute for Clinical and Economic Review – Peterson Health Technology Institute value assessment framework for digital health technologies (2023)
- The effect of an integrated multisector model for achieving the Millennium Development Goals and improving child survival in rural sub-Saharan Africa: a non-randomized controlled assessment (2022)
- Trust between health care and community organizations (2019)
- Accelerating Adoption And Diffusion Of Innovations In Care Delivery (2017)
- How to Build Sustainable Community Health Programs in the United States (2017)
- Health in a Time of Ebola (2014)
- Community Health Workers — A Local Solution to a Global Problem (2013)
- 1 million community health workers in sub-Saharan Africa by 2015 (2013)
- Deployment of community health workers across rural sub-Saharan Africa: financial considerations and operational assumptions (2013)
- Community Health Workers in Global Health: Scale and Scalability (2011)
- One million community health workers: technical task force report (2011)
- Mesenchymal stem cells facilitate axon sorting, myelination, and functional recovery in paralyzed mice deficient in Schwann cell-derived laminin (2010)

== See also ==
Biography at Columbia University Global Mental Health Programs

Biography at Peterson Health Technology Institute

Biography at Paul & Daisy Soros Fellowships for New Americans
