= Asana, Inc. =

American software company

- Formerly: Smiley Abstractions, Inc. (until July 2009)
- Type: Public
- Traded as: NYSE: ASAN; Russell 2000 component
- Founded: December 16, 2008; 17 years ago
- Founders: Dustin Moskovitz; Justin Rosenstein
- Headquarters: San Francisco, California, U.S.
- Key people: Dustin Moskovitz (chairman); Dan Rogers (CEO)
- Services: Process management, project management software, productivity software, team management, work management software, collaborative software
- Revenue: ▲US$724 million (2025)
- Operating income: ▲US$−267 million (2025)
- Net income: ▲US$−256 million (2025)
- Total assets: ▼US$891 million (2025)
- Total equity: ▼US$228 million (2025)
- Owner: Dustin Moskovitz (53%)
- Number of employees: 1,819 (2025)
- Website: asana.com
- Footnotes; Financials as of January 31, 2025.

Asana, Inc. (/əˈsɑːnə/ or /ˈɑːsənə/) is an American software company based in San Francisco, California whose flagship Asana service is a web and mobile "work management" platform designed to help teams organize, track, and manage their work. Asana, Inc. was founded in 2008 by Dustin Moskovitz and Justin Rosenstein. The product launched commercially in April 2012. In September 2020, the company was valued at $5.5 billion following its direct listing.

== History ==
The co-founders met at Facebook, where Moskovitz, Facebook's co-founder and vice president of engineering, and his colleague Rosenstein created a productivity tool called Tasks. In 2008, the co-founders left Facebook to start Asana. A Sanskrit word they chose as the name refers to the place and bodily posture yogi adopts to meditate. With their choice, co-founders wanted to describe their aim to build a product that simplifies things — Asana, a pose, is the result of the combination of form and fluidity to stay focused. Asana officially launched for free out of beta in November 2011 and commercially in April 2012.

In 2014, Asana launched its native iOS app and in January 2015, Asana released its native Android app. In 2016, Asana raised $50 million in Series C financing led by Sam Altman, President of Y Combinator. In 2017, Asana integrated with Gmail, and launched its app in French and German.

By January 2018, more than 35,000 paying customers were using Asana, including CityFibre, AB-InBev, Viessmann, eBay, Uber, Overstock.com, Navy Federal Credit Union, Icelandair, and IBM. That same year, the company raised $75 million in Series D funding led by Generation Investment Management, a firm backed by Al Gore. In November 2018, Asana raised another $50 million in funding in Series E to invest in international and product expansion.

In September 2020, Asana went public on the New York Stock Exchange via a direct public offering. In August 2021, Asana dual listed on the Long-Term Stock Exchange.

In April 2022, Asana released its annual Anatomy of Work Index. The report surveyed the behaviors and attitudes of more than 10,000 knowledge workers globally to highlight differences and year-over-year trends in the modern workplace.

As of September 2022, Asana had 131,000 customers.

In March 2025, co-founder and CEO Dustin Moskovitz announced his retirement, causing Asana's stock to drop 25%. In June 2025, Asana appointed Dan Rogers, formerly of LaunchDarkly, ServiceNow, and Rubrik, as CEO, with Moskovitz remaining as chairman. Rogers officially became CEO on July 21, 2025.

In May 2026, Asana acquired StackAI, a no-code artificial intelligence workflow-automation platform, for $75 million. The acquisition was announced alongside Asana's quarterly earnings, with the company positioning it as part of its strategy to integrate AI agents into enterprise workflows.

== Software ==
Asana is a software-as-a-service platform designed for team collaboration and work management. Teams can create projects, assign tasks, set deadlines, and communicate directly within Asana. It also includes reporting tools, file attachments, calendars, and goal tracking.

In 2022, Asana released features for team organization; this included My Goals, Automatic Progress Updates, and integrations for Google Workspace and Figma.

In October 2024, Asana launched AI Studio to help companies customize their AI agents to perform jobs and actions across product development stages and workflows.Asana launched "AI Teammates", which works with Work Graph, a proprietary data model.

=== API and integrations ===
In April 2012, Asana released its API to third-party developers. Asana's open API provided a means to read and input information and create programmed automation within the app. The Asana API is a RESTful interface, allowing users to update and access much of their data on the platform.

In April 2021, Asana launched Asana Partners, which allows for cross-platform integration with its project management software.

In July 2021, Asana launched an app for Zoom. The Asana app can be opened within the video-conferencing software Zoom.

In 2023, Asana launched product capabilities focused on generative artificial intelligence.

== Reception ==
- 2017: Editor's Choice, PCMag
- 2020, 2025: Best of the Year, PCMag
- 2021: Best Workplace, Best Led Companies, Inc.
- 2022: Brands That Matter, Fast Company

== See also ==
- Collaborative workflow
- Collaborative software
  - List of collaborative software
- Information silo
- Project management software
  - Comparison of project management software
- Social project management
- Team management
