= Cari Tuna =

American philanthropist (born 1985)

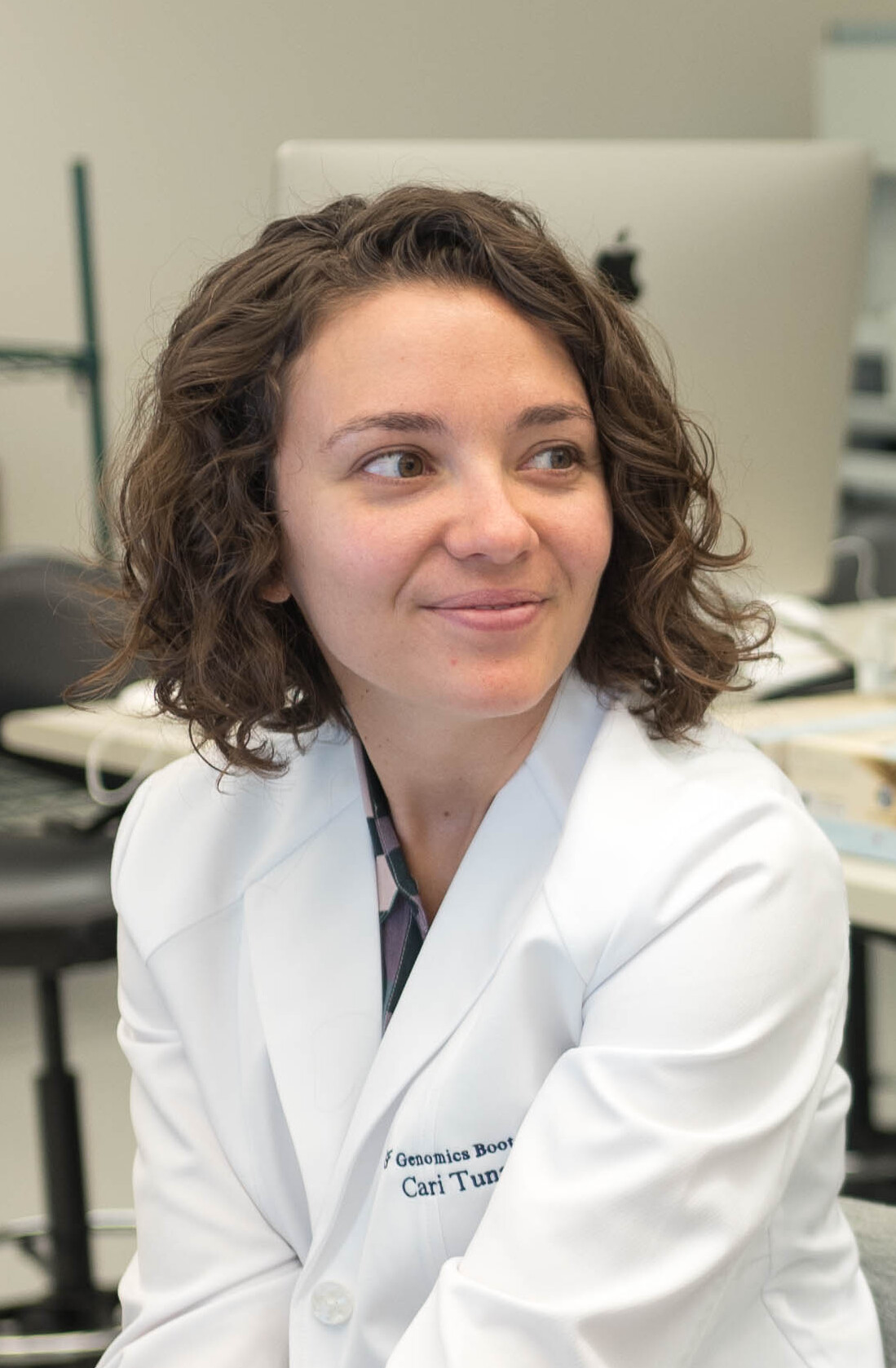
- Tuna in 2016
- Born: October 4, 1985 (age 40); Minnesota, U.S.
- Education: Yale University (Political science, B.A.)
- Occupations: Philanthropist, former journalist
- Known for: Co-founding Coefficient Giving and Good Ventures
- Spouse: Dustin Moskovitz (m. 2013)

Cari Tuna (born October 4, 1985) is an American philanthropist. Formerly a reporter for The Wall Street Journal, she is the co-founder and Chair of the philanthropic organizations Good Ventures and Coefficient Giving. She is married to Facebook and Asana co-founder Dustin Moskovitz. Tuna and Moskovitz were included in Time's 2025 "Time 100 Philanthropy" list for their "data-focused approach to direct funds to causes where they can do the most good." Forbes has described her as "one of the most generous philanthropists in the world."

== Early life ==
Cari Tuna was born in Minnesota, on October 4, 1985. The eldest of three children of two doctors, she was brought up in Evansville, Indiana, where she attended Signature School. There, she was student council president, founded an Amnesty International chapter and was co-valedictorian.

Tuna studied political science at Yale University, where she wrote for the student paper, the Yale Daily News. While studying, she contributed articles to her hometown newspaper, the Evansville Courier & Press, and completed an internship at the Minneapolis Star Tribune. With a basic knowledge of Arabic and Turkish, she considered a career as a foreign correspondent. Tuna graduated with a B.A.

== Career ==
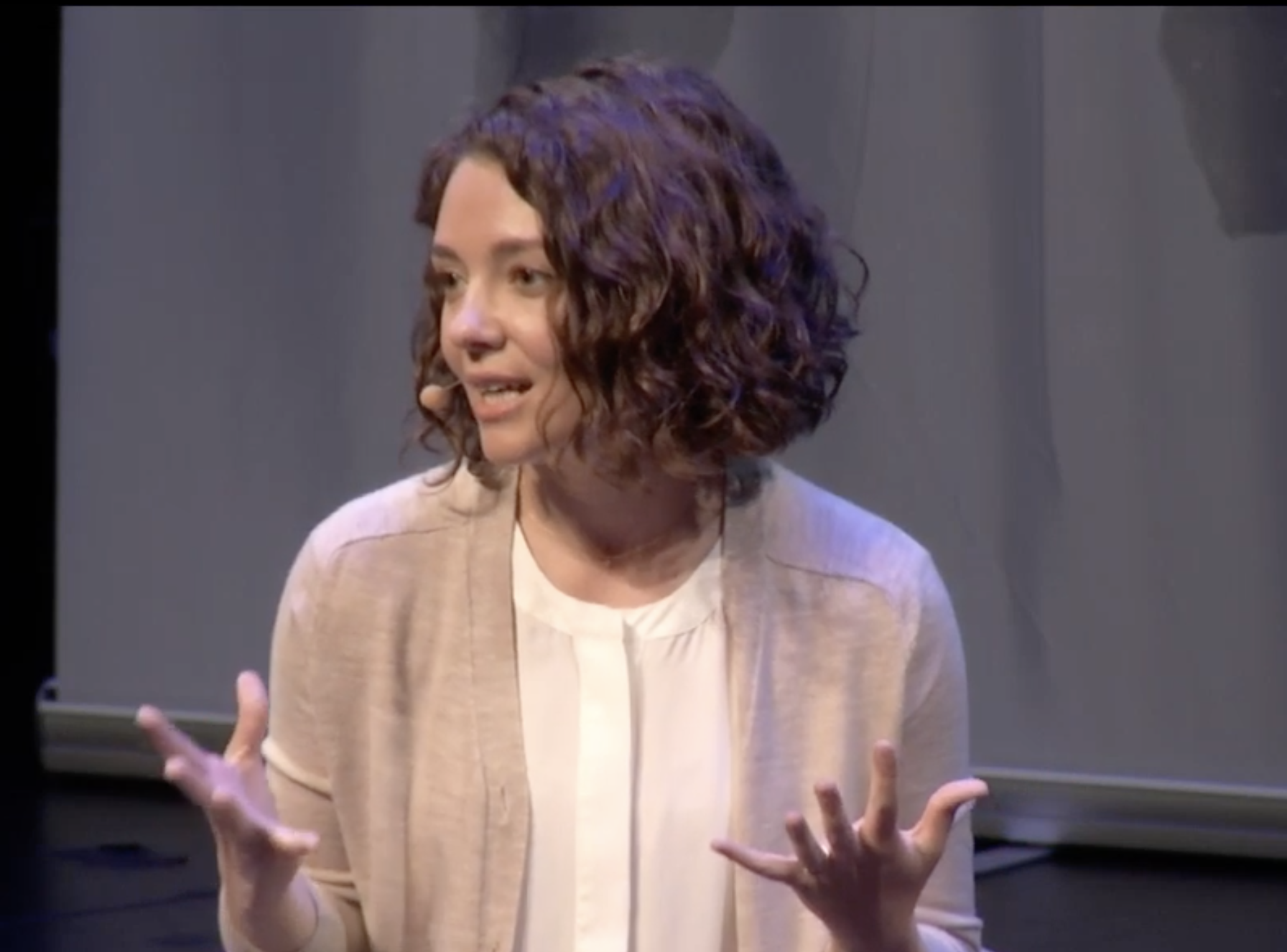
Tuna speaking at EA Global 2016

After graduation, Tuna became a reporter for The Wall Street Journal, where she covered topics including enterprise technology, the California economy, and corporate management.

In 2011, Tuna quit her job at The Wall Street Journal to focus on philanthropy full-time. Tuna is currently the chair of Good Ventures, a foundation she co-founded with her husband, and is the chair of Coefficient Giving, which began as a partnership between Good Ventures and GiveWell, and is now a philanthropic advisor and funder focused on helping philanthropists give more effectively. Tuna also serves on the board of GiveWell.

Tuna has stated that she chooses philanthropic cause areas to support based on their "neglectedness, importance, and tractability (how hard it might be to solve)." Since its founding, Coefficient Giving has directed more than $4 billion in grants across a variety of focus areas, including global health, scientific research, pandemic preparedness, potential risks from advanced AI, and farm animal welfare.

Tuna was included in Time's "100 Most Influential People in AI 2024" for her role at Coefficient Giving. She was also recognized by Melinda French Gates as one of six women "making philanthropic strides", saying that Tuna's "experience as a journalist has informed her approach", adding that she is "rigorous about looking at the data and figuring out how to be as effective as possible."

== Personal life ==
Tuna met internet entrepreneur Dustin Moskovitz on a blind date, and they got married in 2013. In 2010, she and her husband became the youngest couple ever to sign Bill Gates and Warren Buffett's Giving Pledge. Tuna is the youngest individual signer of the Giving Pledge.
