= Dustin Moskovitz =

American internet entrepreneur (born 1984)

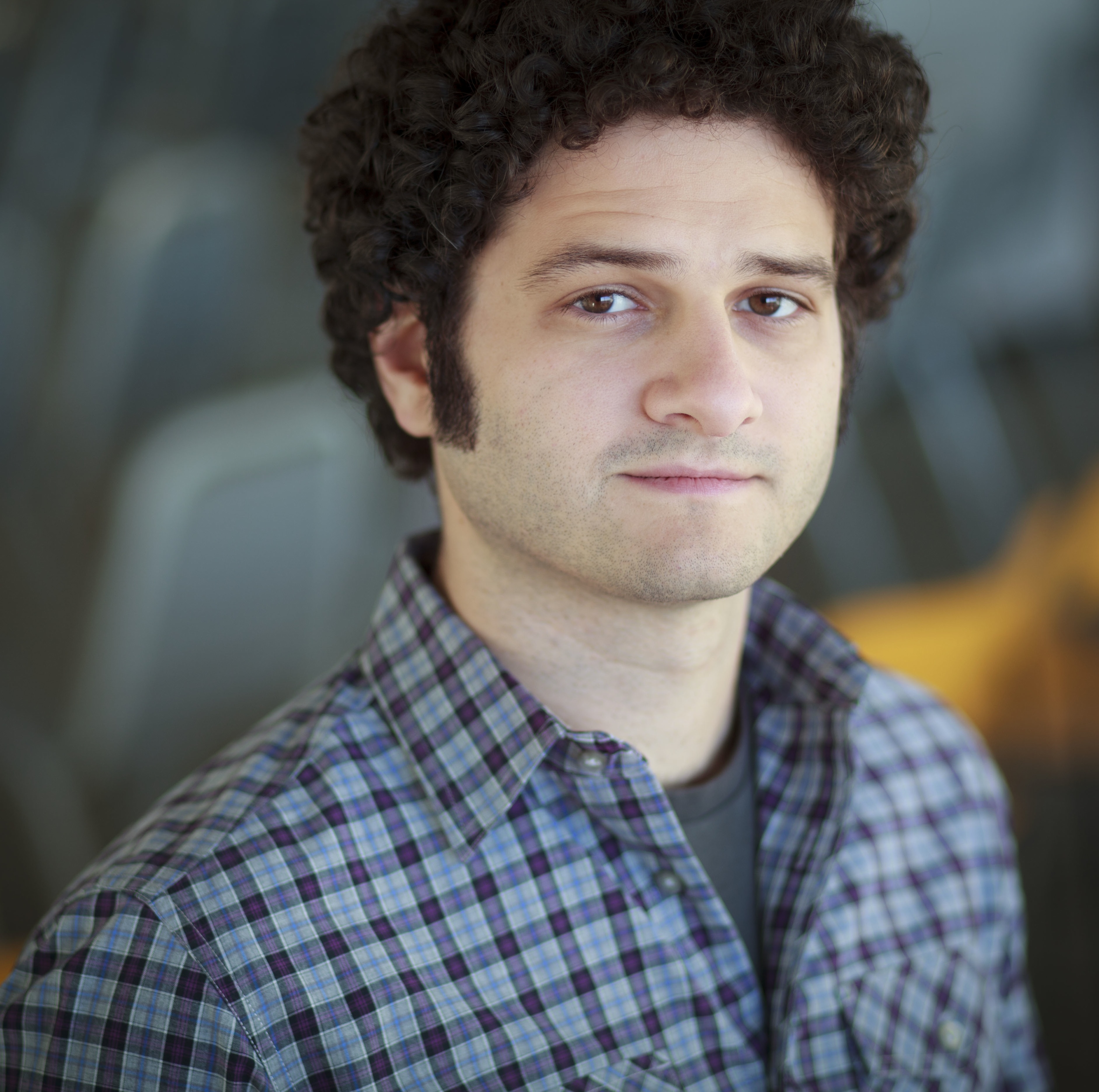
- Moskovitz in 2011
- Born: Dustin Aaron Moskovitz; May 22, 1984 (age 42); Gainesville, Florida, U.S.
- Education: Harvard University (dropped out)
- Occupations: Entrepreneur; philanthropist; computer programmer
- Known for: Co-founding Facebook, Asana, Good Ventures, and Coefficient Giving; World's youngest self-made billionaire (2012)
- Title: Chairman, Asana
- Spouse: Cari Tuna (m. 2013)

Dustin Aaron Moskovitz (/ˈmɒskəvɪts/; born May 22, 1984) is an American internet entrepreneur who co-founded the social media service Facebook and its parent company Meta Platforms with Mark Zuckerberg, Eduardo Saverin, Andrew McCollum and Chris Hughes. In 2008, he left Facebook to co-found Asana with Justin Rosenstein. In March 2011, Forbes reported Moskovitz to be the youngest self-made billionaire in the world, on the basis of his then 2.34% share in Facebook. According to Forbes, as of April 2026, Moskovitz's estimated net worth stood at US$10.2 billion.

== Early life ==
Moskovitz, who is Jewish, was born on May 22, 1984, in Gainesville, Florida, and grew up in Ocala, Florida. He attended Vanguard High School, graduating from the IB Diploma Program. Moskovitz attended Harvard University as an economics major for two years before he moved with Mark Zuckerberg to Palo Alto, California, in order to work full-time on Facebook.

== Career ==
=== Facebook (2004–2008) ===
Four people, three of whom were roommates—Mark Zuckerberg, Eduardo Saverin, Chris Hughes, and Dustin Moskovitz—founded Facebook in their Harvard University dorm room in February 2004. Originally called thefacebook.com, it was intended as an online directory of all Harvard's students to help residential students identify members of other residences. In June 2004, Zuckerberg, Hughes and Moskovitz took a year off from Harvard and moved Facebook's base of operations to Palo Alto, and hired eight employees. They were later joined by Sean Parker. At Facebook, Moskovitz was the company's first chief technology officer and then vice president of engineering.

=== Asana (2008–2025) ===
On October 3, 2008, Moskovitz announced that he was leaving Facebook to form a new company called Asana with Justin Rosenstein, an engineering manager at Facebook. Asana's mission is to improve the efficiency of office workers, providing them with a tool to manage and track projects and tasks. Moskovitz served as CEO, with Rosenstein as board member and advisor. In September 2020, Asana went public at a market value of about $5.5 billion in a direct listing.

In June 2025, Moskovitz stepped down as CEO and transitioned to Board Chair. Around that time, he held a 53% stake in the company.

== Philanthropy ==
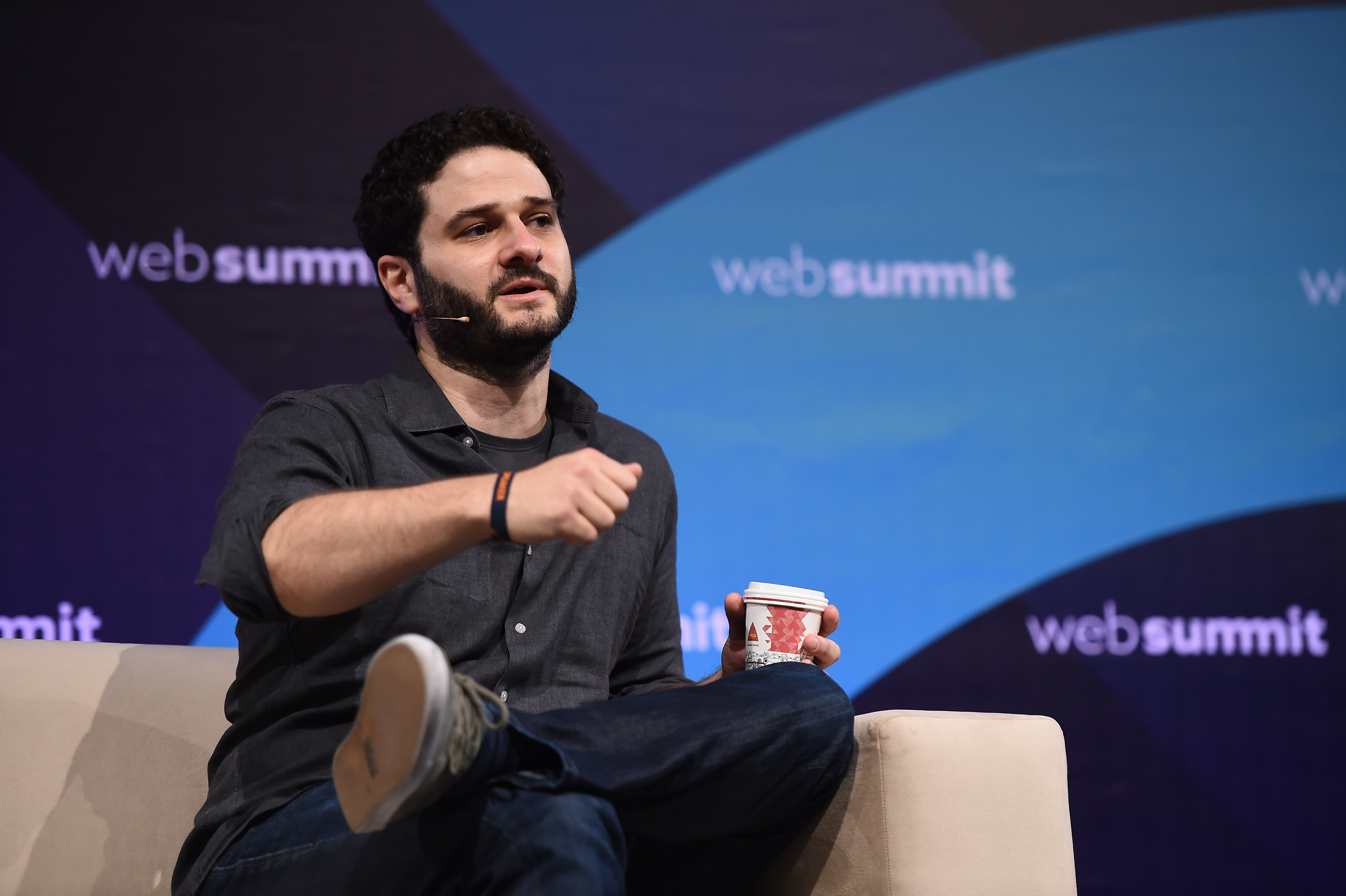
Moskovitz speaking at the Web Summit 2017

Moskovitz co-founded the philanthropic organization Good Ventures with his girlfriend (and now wife) Cari Tuna in 2011, who is the current chair. In June 2012, Good Ventures announced a close partnership with charity evaluator GiveWell. Both organizations "are aiming to do as much good as possible." Good Ventures has distributed approximately $5 billion from 2011 onward, including to GiveWell top charities Against Malaria Foundation, GiveDirectly, Schistosomiasis Control Initiative, and Deworm the World Initiative.

The collaboration with GiveWell led to a spinoff called the Open Philanthropy Project, with the mission "to help others as much as we can with the resources available to us." In November 2025, the organization was renamed Coefficient Giving to reflect its evolution as a philanthropic funder and advisor serving a growing number of donors beyond Good Ventures.

Moskovitz and Tuna are also the youngest couple to sign Bill Gates and Warren Buffett's Giving Pledge, which commits billionaires to give away most of their wealth in the form of philanthropy. Dustin is also a signatory of The Giving What We Can Pledge.

== Politics ==
Moskovitz has voted for the Democratic Party candidates in each election in which he has voted, but he wrote: "Though we've voted for the Democratic nominee each of the times we've cast a ballot, we've considered ourselves independent thinkers who respect candidates and positions from both sides of the aisle." Prior to their donation for the 2016 election cycle, Moskovitz and Tuna had donated roughly $10,000 over their lifetime to federal candidates, most of it to Sean Eldridge, the husband of Facebook co-founder Chris Hughes.

Moskovitz, through Good Ventures, has contributed to California YIMBY, donating around $500,000 to the cause. Good Ventures also contributed $2 million to the New York City based YIMBY group Open New York.

For the 2016 United States presidential election, Moskovitz announced that he and his wife would donate $20 million to support Hillary Clinton, the Democratic Party nominee, arguing that the dangers of a Donald Trump presidency were significant, and that they were making their donation despite being skeptical of allowing large donors to influence election cycles through money. The New York Times quoted Moskovitz's blog post on the subject: "The Republican Party, and Donald Trump in particular, is running on a zero-sum vision, stressing a false contest between their constituency and the rest of the world." This made him the third-largest donor in the 2016 campaigns.

For the 2020 United States presidential election, Moskovitz donated $24 million to support the Democratic Party nominee Joe Biden. Asana's own listed contributions for the election cycle, which are almost all directly from Moskovitz and his wife Cari Tuna, reached around $45 million. This makes Asana the second largest contributor to Biden's presidential campaign after Bloomberg LP.

For the 2024 United States presidential election, Moskovitz donated $10 million to support the Democratic Party nominee Kamala Harris via the Future Forward PAC, with a further $38 million via Asana, making Asana the largest non-PAC donor.

== Other business activities ==
Moskovitz was also the biggest angel investor in the mobile photo-sharing site Path, run by another former member of Facebook, David Morin. It was reported that Moskovitz's advice was important in persuading Morin to reject a $100 million offer for the company from Google, made in February 2011. In 2020, Moskovitz led a $40 million Series D funding round for fusion power start-up Helion Energy.

== Personal life ==
Moskovitz met Cari Tuna on a blind date, and they married in 2013.

He and Tuna have previously attended Burning Man, and Moskovitz has written about his reasons for doing so.

== Media depictions ==
Moskovitz is played in the movie The Social Network by actor Joseph Mazzello. Responding to a question on Quora, Moskovitz said that the film "emphasizes things that didn't matter (like the Winklevoss brothers, whom I've still never even met and had no part in the work we did to create the site over the past 6 years) and leaves out things that did (like the many other people in our lives at the time, who supported us in innumerable ways)."
