= Good Ventures =

American private foundation

- Founded: 2011; 15 years ago
- Founder: Cari Tuna; Dustin Moskovitz
- Type: Private foundation
- Key people: Cari Tuna; Dustin Moskovitz
- Revenue: $177,849,222 (2015)
- Website: goodventures.org

Good Ventures is a private foundation and philanthropic organization in San Francisco. It was co-founded by Cari Tuna, a former Wall Street Journal reporter, and her husband Dustin Moskovitz, co-founder of Facebook and Asana. It has pledged to spend most or all of its money during Tuna and Moskovitz's lifetimes. Tuna and Moskovitz describe their goal as "to take the fullest possible advantage of the opportunity we have to help others."

As of 2025, the foundation has distributed more than $5 billion in grants to address challenges including malaria, lead poisoning, AI safety, and pandemic preparedness. In 2025, Tuna and Moskovitz were named to the inaugural TIME100 Philanthropy list for their "data-centric approach" to giving.

The organization does not have any full-time staff, and instead distributes grants according to recommendations from Coefficient Giving (formerly Open Philanthropy). In 2022, it was the fifth largest foundation in Silicon Valley.

== History ==
Tuna, then a reporter at the San Francisco bureau of the Wall Street Journal, and Moskovitz started dating in 2009. In 2010, they signed the Giving Pledge, becoming the youngest couple to do so, and began investigating how best to give away the money.

They launched their foundation, Good Ventures, in 2011. While Moskovitz continued to run Asana, Tuna quit her job to work full-time on Good Ventures. They first learned about the charity evaluator GiveWell and the movement for effective giving after reading The Life You Can Save, after which Tuna joined the board of GiveWell in April 2011. A partnership between Good Ventures and GiveWell led to the launch of GiveWell Labs in September 2011, a project that conducted research on cost-effective philanthropy.

In March 2013, Good Ventures launched its own website.

In August 2014, GiveWell Labs was renamed the Open Philanthropy Project.

In November 2025, Open Philanthropy rebranded as Coefficient Giving, reflecting its expanded role advising multiple donors beyond Good Ventures. In 2025, Coefficient Giving directed over $200 million from donors other than Good Ventures.

== Operations ==
Most of the money for the foundation comes from the stock Moskovitz obtained as a Facebook and Asana co-founder. The foundation's giving addresses global health and development, abundance and growth, biosecurity and pandemic preparedness, scientific research, navigating transformative AI, farm animal welfare, and more.

== See also ==
- Chan Zuckerberg Initiative
- Giving What We Can
- Laura and John Arnold Foundation
- Mulago Foundation
- Omidyar Network
- Skoll Foundation
