= GiveWell =

American charity evaluator

- Formation: 2007; 19 years ago
- Founders: Holden Karnofsky; Elie Hassenfeld
- Type: 501(c)(3) organization, ruling year 2007
- Purpose: Charity evaluation
- Location: San Francisco, U.S.
- Region served: Global
- President: Elie Hassenfeld
- Disbursements: $396,969,264 (FY 2024)
- Website: givewell.org

GiveWell is an American charity evaluator. GiveWell was founded in 2007 by Holden Karnofsky and Elie Hassenfeld, who aimed to rigorously assess the effectiveness of non-profits with the techniques they used while working at a hedge fund. They received early funding from the William and Flora Hewlett Foundation's Nonprofit Marketplace Initiative. GiveWell later partnered with Good Ventures to establish Open Philanthropy (since renamed Coefficient Giving).

GiveWell has said that it has guided the donations of 150,000 donors and moved $2.6 billion to their recommended organizations. Under their cost-effectiveness estimates, this has averted 340,000 deaths.

== History ==
In 2006, Holden Karnofsky and Elie Hassenfeld, who worked at Bridgewater Associates, formed an informal group with colleagues to evaluate charities based on data and performance metrics similar to those they used at the fund, and were surprised to find the data often didn't exist. The next year, Karnofsky and Hassenfeld formed GiveWell as a nonprofit to provide financial analyst services to donors. They eventually decided to rate charities based on the metric of how much money it cost to save a life. In the first year, funding to run the nonprofit was provided by a fund called the Clear Fund into which the former members of informal club, now directors of GiveWell, had put around $300,000, with about half of that going to fund the organization.

In the first year, Karnofsky and Hassenfeld advocated that charities should generally spend more money on overhead, so that they could pay for staff and record keeping to track how effective their efforts were; this ran counter to standard ways of evaluating charities based on the ratio of overhead to funds deployed for the charity work itself. GiveWell's focus on transparency—specifically, the detailed rationale GiveWell provides for its decision making and the section of its site devoted to its mistakes—has been attributed to the influence of Bridgewater.

In late 2007, GiveWell's founders promoted the organization on several internet blogs and forums using sockpuppets to ask questions about where to find good information about how to donate and then answering them, recommending GiveWell. GiveWell's board of directors investigated and found that the founders Karnofsky and Hassenfeld had acted inappropriately and as a result, it fined each of them $5000 and Karnofsky was demoted from executive director to a program director.

In 2008, GiveWell received funding from the William and Flora Hewlett Foundation's Nonprofit Marketplace Initiative. The Hewlett Foundation continued to be a major funder of GiveWell until March 2014, when the Hewlett Foundation announced that it was ending the Nonprofit Marketplace Initiative based on a 2010 study it commissioned that found that only 3% of donors selected charities based on performance metrics (rather than e.g. loyalty, personal connections, or faith), and a subsequent 2012 study showing that efforts to provide better data were not changing that pattern.

In 2013, GiveWell moved its offices to San Francisco, where people in Silicon Valley had become strong supporters of the effective altruism philosophy.

In 2025, GiveWell operated a rapid response fund in reaction to cuts to USAID by DOGE, disbursing $39 million to aid programs that lost funding.

== Approach ==
Givewell's approach is data-driven, and they recommend charities which work in the developing world.

American philosopher Leif Wenar has criticized the charity evaluator, saying that it does not sufficiently take into account harms caused by its recommended charities or adequately communicate those harms to its readers.

== Open Philanthropy (Coefficient Giving) ==
In 2011, Good Ventures, founded with $8.3 billion by husband and wife Dustin Moskovitz and Cari Tuna, partnered with GiveWell to set up a partner organization called Open Philanthropy, as a vehicle to direct the funding done by Good Ventures. In 2015, Mike Krieger and his fiancee Kaitlyn Trigger pledged $750,000 to Open Philanthropy over two years, with 10% going to fund the operations of the project.

Open Philanthropy has investigated giving money to criminal justice reform and a range of other policy areas, and has funded work into mitigating risks of artificial intelligence, biosecurity, and global health.

In 2017, Open Philanthropy separated from GiveWell, and upon Karnofsky stepping down as Co-Executive Director of GiveWell, Elie Hassenfeld became GiveWell's sole Executive Director.

== Recommended charities ==
GiveWell makes annual recommendations of the most cost-effective charities. They estimate that they save an average of one life for every US$3,500–5,500 donated. As of November 2025, the top recommended charities are:

- Malaria Consortium (malaria prevention)
- Against Malaria Foundation (malaria prevention)
- Helen Keller International (supplements to prevent vitamin A deficiency)
- New Incentives (conditional cash transfers to encourage vaccination)

== See also ==
- American Institute of Philanthropy – American nonprofit organization
- Earning to give – Pursuit of high income to donate more
- Ethics of philanthropy – Ethical issues specific to philanthropy
- Founders Pledge – English charitable non-profit
- Mulago Foundation - US foundation focused on impact at scale
- Giving What We Can – Nonprofit organisation that promotes effective giving
- Raising for Effective Giving – Charity fundraising organization
- Venture philanthropy – Impact investment used for philanthropy
