= Lead Exposure Elimination Project =

NGO for lead reduction in developing countries

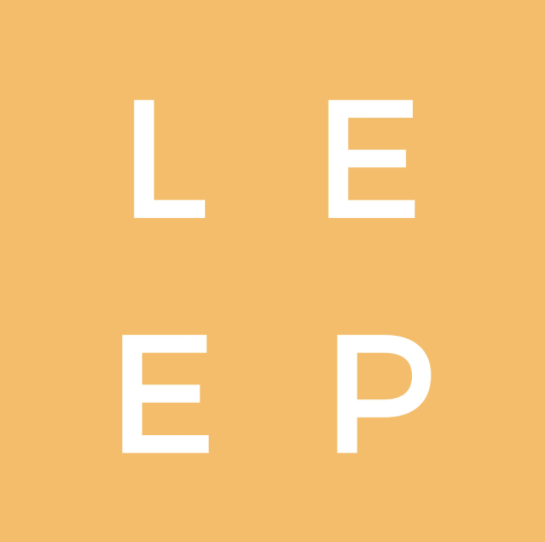
- Abbreviation: LEEP
- Formation: 2020; 6 years ago
- Legal status: 501(c)(3)
- Headquarters: London, England, United Kingdom
- Region served: Global
- Fields: Global health, international development
- Co-Founders: Lucia Coulter; Jack Rafferty
- Revenue: US$8,970,000 (2023)
- Expenses: US$830,735 (2023)
- Staff: 19
- Website: leadelimination.org

Lead Exposure Elimination Project (LEEP) is an international non-governmental organization aimed at reducing lead exposure in low- and middle-income countries. Based in London, England, it was founded in 2020 to promote research and advocacy on the prevalence and consequences of lead poisoning in the developing world. Giving What We Can has identified LEEP as among the most cost effective charitable organizations in the world, preventing childhood lead exposure at a cost of US$1.66 on average, and saving disability-adjusted life years for approximately US$14. In 2023, LEEP had revenues of US$8.97 million.

== History ==
LEEP was founded in 2020 by Lucia Coulter, a British physician and former NHS doctor, and Jack Rafferty, a former NGO executive. The organization was incubated by Charity Entrepreneurship, which supported LEEP in its first year with a US$60,000 grant.

Among LEEP's first projects was a study of the incidence of lead in paint brands in Malawi. Conducted in partnership with Malawi's Bureau of Standards, the study found that 53% of sampled paints had dangerous levels of lead. After its paint study, LEEP partnered with the Malawian government to craft regulations against lead paint, offering technical support to manufacturers to find alternative formulas. A follow up paint study conducted in 2023 found that the share of lead contaminated paint samples in Malawi fell to 33%.

LEEP has replicated its "playbook" of testing, regulation, and enforcement in several other countries. In 2022, LEEP supported a study of lead paint in the cities of Gaborone, Botswana, and Harare, Zimbabwe, in collaboration with researchers at the Faculty of Medicine and Health Sciences of the University of Zimbabwe. Results found that over 70% of sampled paints had lead levels above the regulatory limit.

LEEP has also conducted research and advocacy in Pakistan, where 70% of children have blood lead levels exceeding 5 micrograms per deciliter, the World Health Organization guideline for when it is worthwhile identifying and terminating sources of lead exposure. In their initial survey, LEEP found that 40% of sampled paints had lead levels above the legal limit in Pakistan, suggesting poor enforcement of existing rules. In response, LEEP worked with the Pakistani government and local paint manufacturers to improve enforcement of regulations against lead adulteration. Within four months, ten paint manufacturers, five of them among the most popular paint brands in Pakistan, agreed to switch to lead-free formulations.

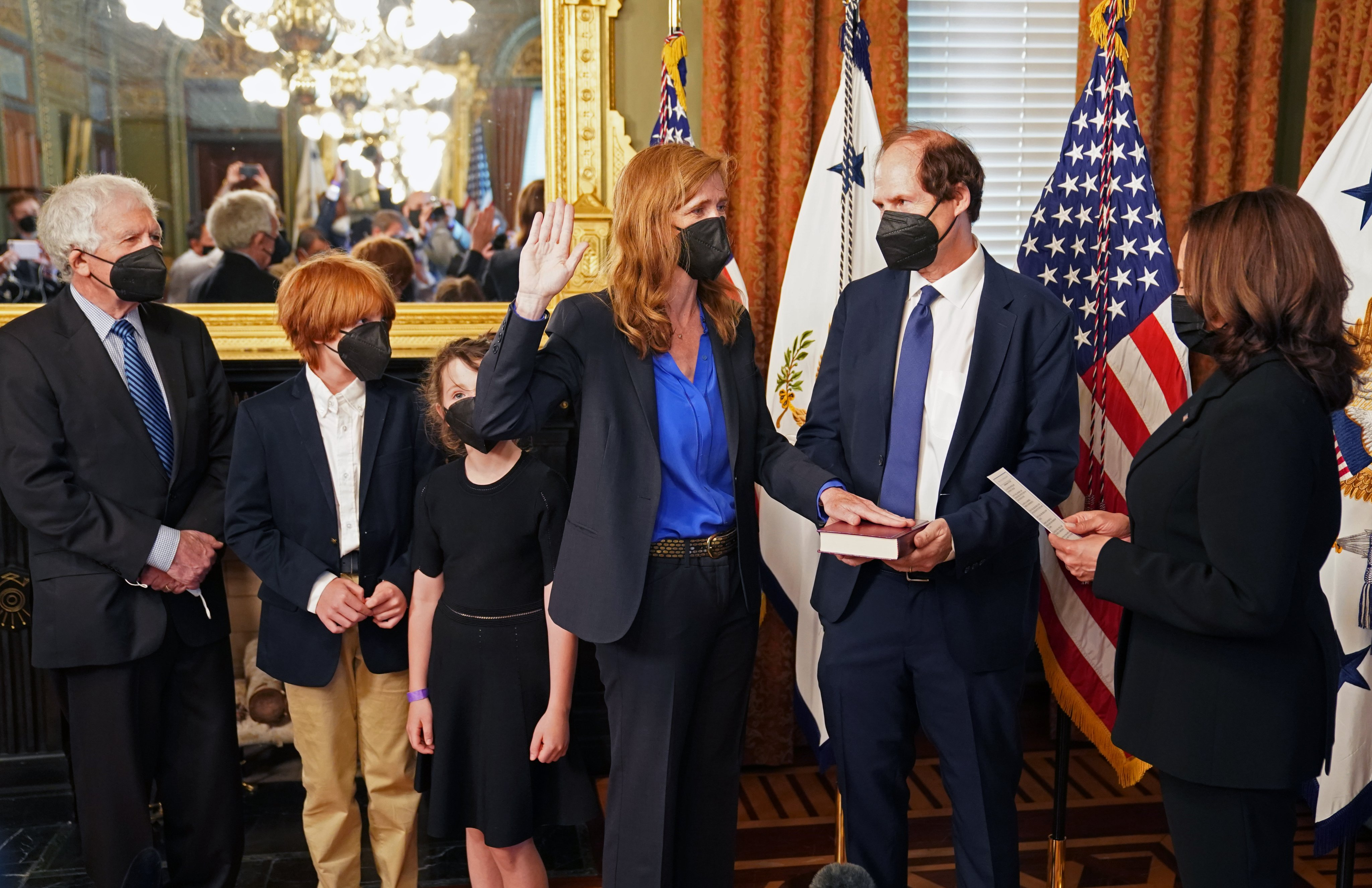
Swearing in of USAID Administrator Samantha Power

In 2022, LEEP co-founders Lucia Coulter and Jack Rafferty were named to Vox's inaugural "Future Perfect 50", a list of 50 individuals working on important, neglected, and tractable global issues. That same year, Coulter and LEEP co-executive director Clare Donaldson joined a working group convened by the Center for Global Development aimed at mitigating the burden of lead poisoning in the developing world.

In December 2023, LEEP co-founder Lucia Coulter appeared on the podcast of 80,000 Hours, a non-profit organization that advocates and advises individuals on how to have the highest social impact over the course of their careers.

At the annual meeting of the World Health Assembly in 2024, LEEP participated in a roundtable on the dangers of lead exposure alongside representatives from USAID, UNICEF, and the governments of Nigeria, Bangladesh, and Vietnam. The meeting was called in response to a call for action by USAID administrator Samantha Power, who has highlighted lead exposure as a priority area of focus.

== Funding ==
Logo of Open Philanthropy, an effective altruism inspired grant maker and LEEP funder

LEEP was incubated and provided with seed funding by Charity Entrepreneurship, an organization that promotes innovative, evidence-based initiatives to maximize social impact. In 2023, LEEP raised US$8.97 million, with the majority of its revenue coming from Founders Pledge, Schmidt Futures, and the Greenbridge Family Foundation. LEEP has also raised significant funds from Open Philanthropy, an effective altruism inspired grant maker, which identified reducing childhood lead exposure as a neglected, tractable, and cost effective way of improving welfare. LEEP is one of three main grantees, alongside Pure Earth and the Center for Global Development, supported by Open Philanthropy that aim to reduce lead exposure in low and middle income countries. In 2023, LEEP also received over US$1.7 million in donations from private individuals including William MacAskill, a philosopher and originator of the effective altruism movement.

Since 2024, LEEP has partnered with the United States Agency for International Development to reduce lead exposure in low and middle income countries. USAID Administrator Samantha Power has observed that the agency is "well-positioned to convene around, advocate for, and support lead mitigation efforts by partner governments."
