= Earning to give =

Pursuit of high income to donate more

Earning to give involves deliberately pursuing a high-earning career for the purpose of donating a significant portion of earned income, typically because of a desire to do effective altruism. Advocates of earning to give contend that maximizing the amount one can donate to charity is an important consideration for individuals when deciding what career to pursue.

== Proponents ==
In his 1872 sermon "The Use of Money", theologian John Wesley urged followers: "Having, First, gained all you can, and, Secondly saved all you can, Then "give all you can."" In the 1996 book Living High and Letting Die, the philosopher Peter Unger wrote that it was morally praiseworthy and perhaps even morally required for people in academia who could earn substantially greater salaries in the business world to leave academia, earn the greater salaries, and donate most of the extra money to charity. Moral philosopher Peter Singer laid the foundations for effective altruism and earning to give in his 1971 essay "Famine, Affluence and Morality" and since advocated for donating considerable amounts of one's income to effective charitable organizations. Singer is a public proponent of effective altruism and endorsed earning to give in his 2013 TED talk. Associate Professor in Philosophy at Oxford University William MacAskill promoted earning to give as one possible high impact career in several news articles and in his 2015 book Doing Good Better: Effective Altruism and a Radical New Way to Make a Difference. MacAskill is the co-founder and president of 80,000 Hours, a nonprofit which conducts research on careers with positive social impact and provides career advice. Initially, the organization recommended earning to give as a career path with a high impact potential for effective altruists, though more recently it has deemphasised this approach, in favour of alternative paths like research, advocacy or policy reform. Dave Ramsey regularly encourages readers to "live like no one else" (by saving money and getting out of debt) so they can "give like no one else" (by being generous with their earnings).

== In practice ==
Many of the people who practice earning to give consider themselves to be part of the effective altruism community. Some donate more than 50% of their income, more than the 10% required for the basic Giving What We Can pledge. Some of them choose to live frugally to donate more money. Jobs in finance, particularly in quantitative trading, are popular for those pursuing earning to give. The idea promoted by people practicing earning to give is that it may be more effective than working at a NGO, because if the NGO becomes ineffective, then one can easily switch to donating to a different charity.

== Debate ==
David Brooks criticized the concept in his column in The New York Times, arguing that, while altruists may start doing "earning to give" to realize their deepest commitments, their values may erode over time, becoming progressively less altruistic. Similarly, John Humphrys criticised this idea on the BBC Today programme, saying that people interested in becoming wealthy tend to be selfish and that idealistic young people will become cynical as they age. In addition, Brooks objected to the view on which altruists should turn themselves "into a machine for the redistribution of wealth." Peter Singer responded to these criticisms in his book The Most Good You Can Do by giving examples of people who have been earning to give for years without losing their altruistic motivation. William MacAskill also defended the practice against Brooks' criticisms in The Washington Post. Dana Goldstein has also criticized earning to give, prompting a response from Reihan Salam. Another concern was raised in the Oxford Left Review by Pete Mills, who wrote that lucrative careers perpetuate an unjust system.

Sam Bankman-Fried, at one point the wealthiest person in the world under 30, founded the cryptocurrency exchange FTX with the explicit goal of donating the vast majority of profits to cost-effective causes. Bankman-Fried started philanthropic foundations with some of his earnings, but upon a crisis leading to FTX's bankruptcy, staff from the FTX Future Fund publicly resigned, saying that they had "fundamental questions about the legitimacy and integrity" of Bankman-Fried's businesses. The crisis at FTX led to speculation about whether donations linked to the firm might be clawed back from organizations that Bankman-Fried's foundations funded. In some cases, donations have been clawed back from charitable organizations, including $200,000 that had to be returned in 2011 by charities funded by convicted fraudster Tom Petters.

=== Earning to give through jobs that may cause harm ===
High profile individuals and institutions within the movement have disagreed on when it is appropriate to work in morally controversial jobs. William MacAskill argued in 2014 that sufficient donations might justify an otherwise morally controversial career, since the impact of taking an unethical job is small if someone else would have taken it regardless, while the impact of the donations could be large. Singer compared it to the moral dilemma of whether to go fight on the front lines rather than stand guard in a death camp. According to Singer, from a consequentialist point of view, one should first of all consider whether one's role will make a difference. If easily replaceable with someone else, getting fired would not bring any benefit to the community, whereas career advancement makes it possible to donate generously to trusted charities. Equally, a soldier who decided to sacrifice himself at the front rather than be employed in a death camp would result in his probable death and his replacement in the camp with someone who might be a sadistic murderer. According to Kenan Malik, "Not only does this logic defy our moral intuitions, it can also be applied less distastefully to justify almost any action, including Bankman-Fried’s. He might have scammed investors but at least he gave more money to charity than another scammer might have done".

Singer has also said that even those who take a job complicit in causing harm can, for example, lobby the organization to change its harmful practices, which may be easier to do from their position inside the organization. Or they could quit and blow the whistle on the organization, which might not be possible without gaining information while on the job. In 2017, 80,000 Hours recommended that it is better to avoid careers that do significant direct harm, even if it seems like the negative consequences could be outweighed by donations. This is because the harms from such careers may be hidden or otherwise hard to measure.
