= Doing Good Better =

2015 book about effective altruism by William MacAskill

Doing Good Better: Effective Altruism and How You Can Make a Difference
- Hardcover edition
- Author: William MacAskill
- Language: English
- Subject: Effective altruism
- Publisher: Random House
- Publication date: July 28, 2015
- ISBN: 978-1592409105
- Website: www.williammacaskill.com/book

Doing Good Better: Effective Altruism and How You Can Make a Difference is a 2015 book by William MacAskill that serves as a primer on the effective altruism movement that seeks to do the most good. It is published by Random House and was released on July 28, 2015.

== Reception ==
=== Reviews ===
Reviews of the book were generally positive. Writing for Marginal Revolution, George Mason University economics professor Alex Tabarrok described the book as "that rare beast, a hard-headed, soft-hearted proponent of saving the world." He concluded his review by writing:

Fortunately, effective altruism doesn't require Mother Theresa-like levels of altruism or Spock-like level of hard-headedness. What is needed is a cultural change so that people become proud of how they give and not just how much they give. Imagine, for example, that it becomes routine to ask "How does Givewell rate your charity?" Or, "GiveDirectly gives poor people cash—can you demonstrate that your charity is more effective than cash?" The goal is not the questioning. The goal is to give people the warm glow when they can answer.

A review in Kirkus Reviews concluded: "There are thousands of charities in the world, most of which are attempting to do good for people. The author shows readers how to take any of these charities and assess them against his structure so they can make informed decisions on their charitable contributions. Highly useful guidelines to finding the perfect charity worthy of your money."

The Sunday Times called the book a "surprising and counterintuitive look at the best ways to make a difference." Marc Gunther reviewed the book for Nonprofit Chronicles, writing "There's no better time to start now" on the agenda that MacAskill had set out in the book.

Sue Desmond-Hellmann, CEO of the Bill & Melinda Gates Foundation, reviewed the book favorably, concluding: "Getting in the habit of giving back is never a bad thing. While good intentions might not be enough in their own right, a world full of people who care — and who are open to doing good better — can make a world of difference."

Steven Levitt, University of Chicago economist and author of Freakonomics, said of the book: "Beautifully written and extremely smart. Doing Good Better should be required reading for anyone interested in making the world better." The book's website also quotes favorable blurbs from bioethicist and effective altruism proponent Peter Singer, Skype and Kazaa co-founder Jaan Tallinn, Center for Applied Rationality president and co-founder Julia Galef, business school professor Adam Grant, anti-aging researcher Aubrey de Grey, nanotechnology pioneer Eric Drexler, astronomer Martin Rees, and linguist and researcher Steven Pinker.

LinkedIn co-founder Reid Hoffman wrote a generally positive review of the book, but disagreed with the book's dismissal of local philanthropy. He argued that local philanthropic leadership had instrumental value and also helped set a good example for other community members.

Kate Grant, CEO of the Fistula Foundation, that had been discussed in the book, was critical of MacAskill's description of the organization's work, claiming that it was outdated and misleading. She said that this might indicate deeper problems with the quality of research for the book.

=== Other mentions ===
An article by Derek Thompson for The Atlantic, that discussed the effective altruism movement at length and William MacAskill's work in particular, briefly discussed Doing Good Better.

A Boston Review Forum contribution on effective altruism by Paul Brest, former President of the William and Flora Hewlett Foundation published on July 1, 2015, called MacAskill's book an "excellent new book" and viewed it as a key part of a strategy to move the world in the direction of effective altruism.

In 2015 The New York Times based an article about effective altruism principles on the book and MacAskill's arguments.

== See also ==
- The Most Good You Can Do, an April 2015 book by Peter Singer covering similar ground.
- 80,000 Hours, a non-profit cofounded by MacAskill whose research informed Doing Good Better's ninth chapter on high-impact career choice.
- Giving What We Can, an effective altruism organisation building a community of people who pledge to donate at least ten percent of their income to effective charities.
- What We Owe the Future, another book by MacAskill
