= Benjamin Todd =

British philanthropist (21st century)

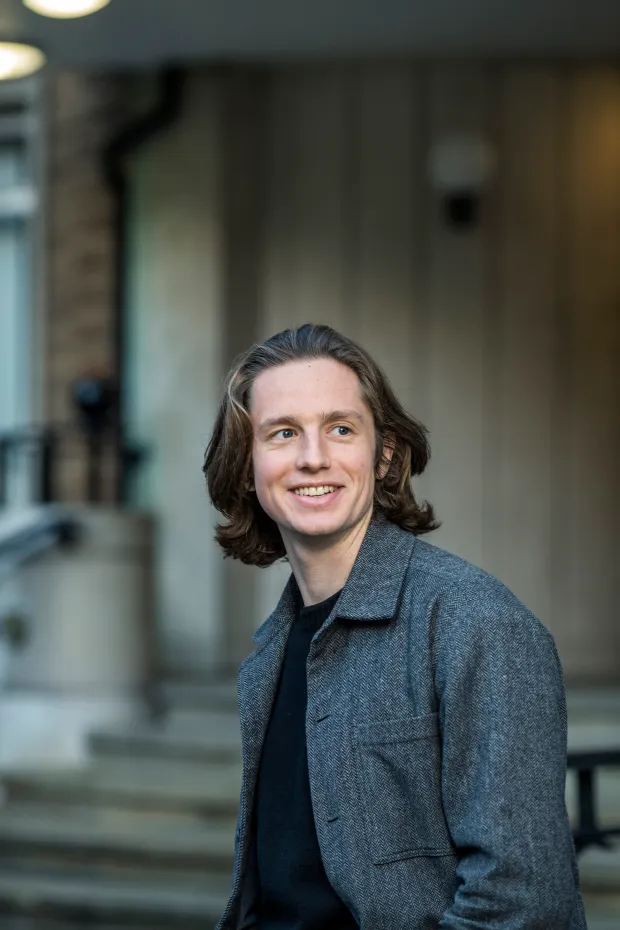
- Education: The Perse School; Hills Road Sixth Form College; Balliol College, Oxford (Physics and Philosophy)
- Occupations: Author, nonprofit executive, consultant
- Known for: Co-founding 80,000 Hours
- Website: benjamintodd.org

Benjamin Todd is a British author and nonprofit executive. He is the co-founder and former CEO of 80,000 Hours, a nonprofit organization that provides career advice focused on maximizing social impact.

== Early life and education ==
Todd was educated at The Perse School and Hills Road Sixth Form College, and studied Physics and Philosophy at Balliol College, Oxford.

== Career ==
=== 80,000 Hours ===
In 2011, Todd co-founded 80,000 Hours with William MacAskill. In 2015, the organization was accepted into the Y Combinator startup accelerator program.

=== Writing and media ===
Todd wrote the book 80,000 Hours: Find a Fulfilling Career that Does Good, published in 2017. A revised edition was published by Penguin Random House in 2026. He gave a 2017 TEDx talk, "To find work you love, don't follow your passion".

Todd has discussed career choice on BBC Radio 4, in The Telegraph, and on the Vox podcast Future Perfect.

=== Current work ===
Todd works as an author and consultant on strategy for nonprofit organizations, and has advised the Global Priorities Institute and the Centre for Effective Altruism.

== Personal life ==
Todd has taken the Giving What We Can pledge (in November 2009) to donate at least 10% of his income to effective charities.
