= Effective altruism =

Philosophical and social movement

Effective altruism (EA) is a 21st-century philosophical and social movement that advocates impartially calculating benefits and prioritizing causes to provide the greatest good. Proponents describe the movement as "using evidence and reason to figure out how to benefit others as much as possible, and taking action on that basis". People who pursue the goals of effective altruism, who are sometimes called effective altruists, (Note: The term effective altruists is used to refer to people who embrace effective altruism in many published sources such as Oliver (2014), Singer (2015), and MacAskill (2017), though as Pummer & MacAskill (2020) noted, calling people "effective altruists" minimally means that they are engaged in the project of "using evidence and reason to try to find out how to do the most good, and on this basis trying to do the most good", not that they are perfectly effective nor even that they necessarily participate in the effective altruism community.) follow a variety of approaches proposed by the movement, such as donating to selected charities and choosing careers, with the goal of maximising positive impact. The movement has spurred the creation of research centers, advisory organizations, and charities, which have collectively directed billions of dollars.

A defining feature of effective altruism is impartiality, specifically the global equal consideration of interests when choosing beneficiaries. Popular cause priorities within effective altruism include global health and development, social and economic inequality, animal welfare, and risks to the survival or flourishing of humanity over the long-term future. Only a small portion of all charities are affiliated with effective altruism, except in niche areas such as farmed-animal welfare, AI safety, and biosecurity.

The movement developed during the 2000s, and the name effective altruism was coined in 2011. Philosophers influential to the movement include Peter Singer, Toby Ord, and William MacAskill. Effective altruism is most popular within the Anglosphere, with concentrations at elite universities in the United States and United Kingdom, as well as in and around the technology industry in the San Francisco Bay Area.

Some have argued that effective altruism focuses on incremental interventions instead of systemic or political interventions. The movement received mainstream attention and criticism with the bankruptcy of the cryptocurrency exchange FTX in 2022 as founder Sam Bankman-Fried was a major funder of some organisations in effective altruism. Some women in the San Francisco Bay Area have criticized what they described as a culture of sexual misconduct occurring among some participants in the movement.

== History ==
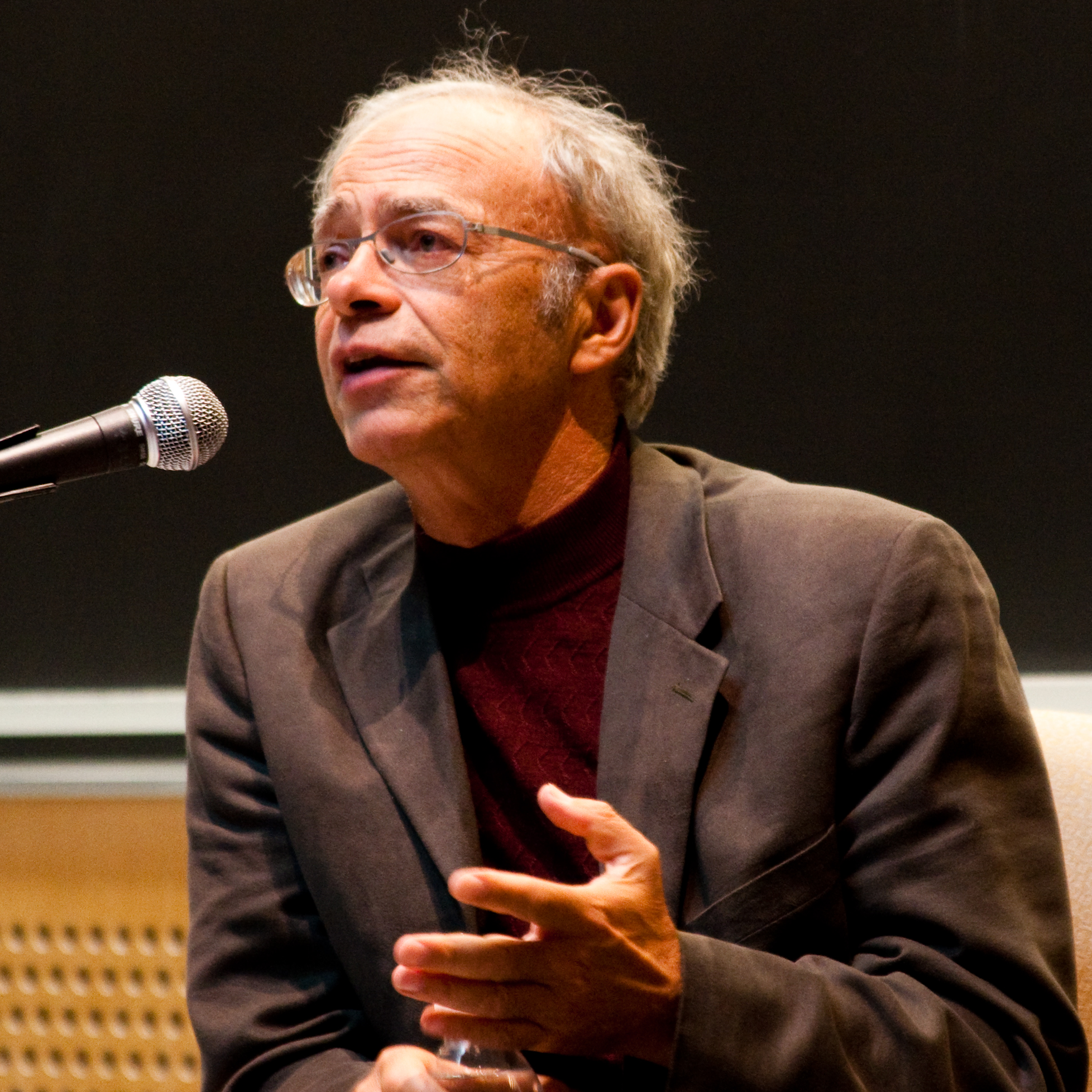
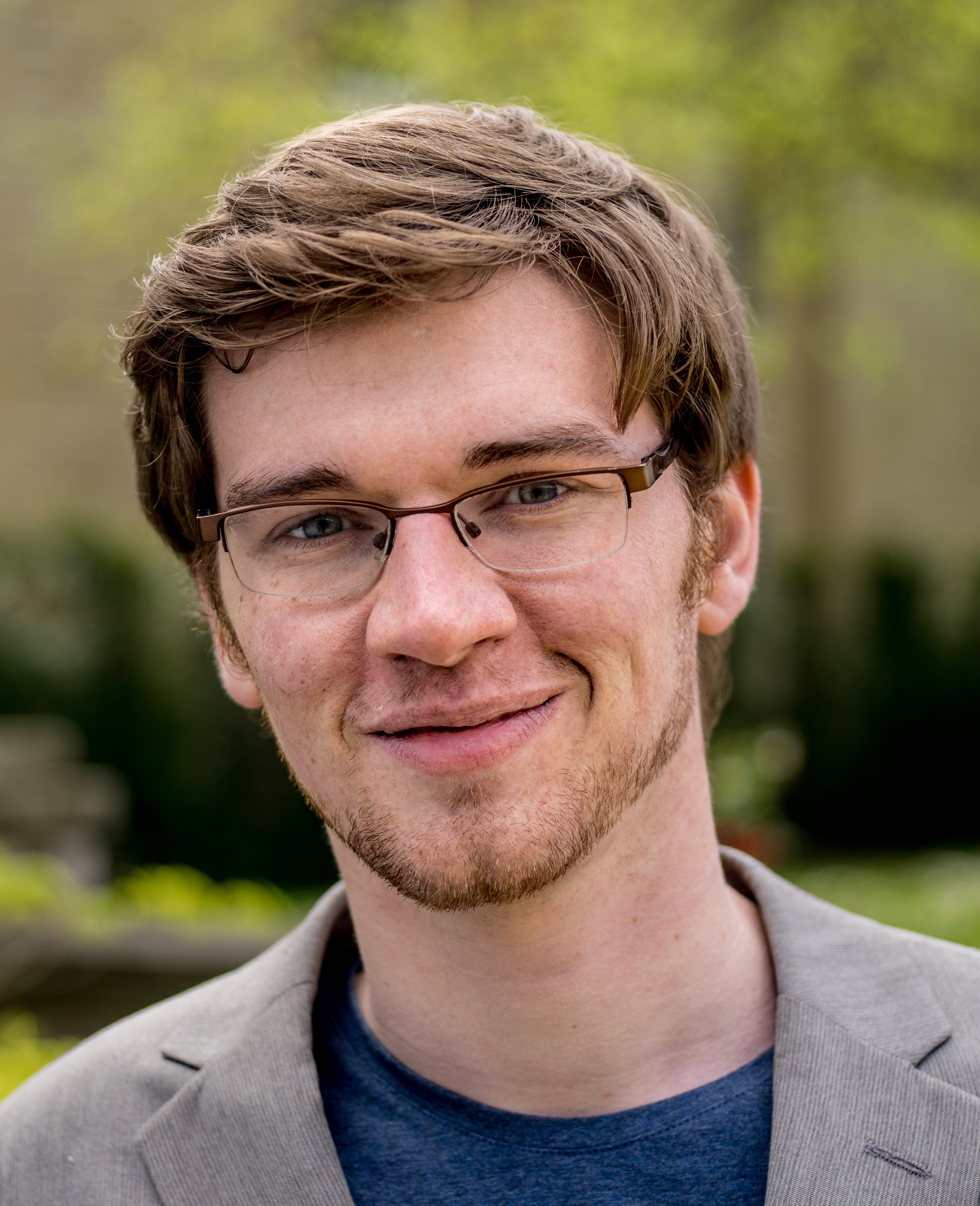
Peter Singer and William MacAskill are among several philosophers who have helped popularize effective altruism.

Beginning in the latter half of the 2000s, several communities centered around altruist, rationalist, and futurological concerns started to converge, such as:

- The evidence-based charity community centered around GiveWell, including Open Philanthropy, which originally came out of GiveWell Labs but then became independent.
- The community around pledging and career selection for effective giving, centered around the Giving What We Can and 80,000 Hours nonprofits.
- The Singularity Institute (now MIRI) for studying the safety of artificial intelligence, the Future of Humanity Institute studying topics such as existential risk, and the LessWrong discussion forum, which focuses on rationalism.

In 2011, Giving What We Can and 80,000 Hours decided to incorporate into an umbrella organization and held a vote for their new name; the "Centre for Effective Altruism" was selected. The Effective Altruism Global conference has been held since 2013. As the movement formed, it attracted individuals who were not part of a specific community, but who had been following the Australian moral philosopher Peter Singer's work on applied ethics, particularly "Famine, Affluence, and Morality" (1972), Animal Liberation (1975), and The Life You Can Save (2009). Singer himself used the term in 2013, in a TED talk titled "The Why and How of Effective Altruism".

=== Notable philanthropists ===
An estimated $416 million was donated to effective charities identified by the movement in 2019, representing a 37% annual growth rate since 2015. Two of the largest donors in the effective altruism community, Dustin Moskovitz, who had become wealthy through co-founding Facebook, and his wife Cari Tuna, hope to donate most of their net worth of over $11 billion for effective altruist causes through the private foundation Good Ventures and are major funders of Open Philanthropy. Others influenced by effective altruism include Sam Bankman-Fried, and professional poker players Dan Smith and Liv Boeree. Jaan Tallinn, the Estonian billionaire founder of Skype, is known for donating to some effective altruist causes. Sam Bankman-Fried launched a philanthropic organization called the FTX Foundation in February 2021, and it made contributions to a number of effective altruist organizations, but it was shut down in November 2022 when FTX collapsed. Actor Joseph Gordon-Levitt has publicly stated he would like to bring the ideas of effective altruism to a broader audience. Musician José Gonzáles has been inspired by the effective altruist philosophy to donate 10% of his income since 2017, when he signed the Giving What We Can pledge. Elon Musk spoke at an effective altruism conference in 2015. He described MacAskill's 2022 book What We Owe the Future as "a close match for my philosophy", but has not officially joined the movement. An article in The Chronicle of Philanthropy argued that the record of Musk's substantive alignment with effective altruism was "choppy", and Bloomberg News noted that his 2021 charitable contributions showed "few obvious signs that effective altruism ... impacted Musk's giving."

=== Notable publications and media ===
A number of books and articles related to effective altruism have been published that have codified, criticized, and brought more attention to the movement. In 2015, philosopher Peter Singer published The Most Good You Can Do: How Effective Altruism Is Changing Ideas About Living Ethically. The same year, the Scottish philosopher and ethicist William MacAskill published Doing Good Better: How Effective Altruism Can Help You Make a Difference. B.V.E. Hyde describes these two books as "the bibles of effective altruism". In 2018, American news website Vox launched its Future Perfect section, led by journalist Dylan Matthews, which publishes articles and podcasts on "finding the best ways to do good". In 2019, Oxford University Press published the volume Effective Altruism: Philosophical Issues, edited by Hilary Greaves and Theron Pummer. More recent books have emphasized concerns for future generations. In 2020, the Australian moral philosopher Toby Ord published The Precipice: Existential Risk and the Future of Humanity, while MacAskill published What We Owe the Future in 2022. In 2023, Oxford University Press published the volume The Good it Promises, The Harm it Does: Critical Essays on Effective Altruism, edited by Carol J. Adams, Alice Crary, and Lori Gruen.

== Philosophy ==
Effective altruists focus on the many philosophical questions related to the most effective ways to benefit others. Such philosophical questions shift the starting point of reasoning from "what to do" to "why" and "how". There is not a consensus on the answers, and there are also differences between effective altruists who believe that they should do the most good they possibly can with all of their resources (Note: Singer (2015) expressed a clearly normative view: "Effective altruism is based on a very simple idea: we should do the most good we can. Obeying the usual rules about not stealing, cheating, hurting, and killing is not enough, or at least not enough for those of us who have the great good fortune to live in material comfort, who can feed, house, and clothe ourselves and our families and still have money or time to spare. Living a minimally acceptable ethical life involves using a substantial part of our spare resources to make the world a better place. Living a fully ethical life involves doing the most good we can." (p. vii)) and those who only try do the most good they can within a defined budget.

According to MacAskill, the view of effective altruism as doing the most good one can within a defined budget can be compatible with a wide variety of views on morality and meta-ethics, as well as traditional religious teachings on altruism such as in Christianity. Effective altruism can also be in tension with religion where religion emphasizes spending resources on worship and evangelism instead of causes that do the most good. Other than Peter Singer and MacAskill, philosophers associated with effective altruism include Nick Bostrom, Toby Ord, Hilary Greaves, and Derek Parfit. Economist Yew-Kwang Ng conducted similar research in welfare economics and moral philosophy.

The Centre for Effective Altruism lists the following four principles that unite effective altruism: prioritization, impartial altruism, open truthseeking, and a collaborative spirit. To support people's ability to act altruistically on the basis of impartial reasoning, the effective altruism movement promotes values and actions such as a collaborative spirit, honesty, transparency, and publicly pledging to donate a certain percentage of income or other resources.

=== Impartiality ===
Effective altruism aims to emphasize impartial reasoning in that everyone's well-being counts equally. Singer, in his 1972 essay "Famine, Affluence, and Morality", wrote:

It makes no moral difference whether the person I can help is a neighbor's child ten yards away from me or a Bengali whose name I shall never know, ten thousand miles away ... The moral point of view requires us to look beyond the interests of our own society.

Impartiality combined with seeking to do the most good leads to prioritizing benefits to those who are in a worse state, because anyone who happens to be worse off will benefit more from an improvement in their state, all other things being equal.

==== Scope of moral consideration ====
One issue related to moral impartiality is the question of which beings are deserving of moral consideration. Some effective altruists consider the well-being of non-human animals in addition to humans, and advocate for animal welfare issues such as ending factory farming. Those who subscribe to longtermism include future generations as possible beneficiaries and try to improve the moral value of the long-term future, for example by reducing existential risks.

==== Criticism of impartiality ====
The drowning child analogy in Singer's essay provoked philosophical debate. In response to a version of Singer's drowning child analogy, philosopher Kwame Anthony Appiah in 2006 asked whether the most effective action of a man in an expensive suit, confronted with a drowning child, would not be to save the child and ruin his suit—but rather, sell the suit and donate the proceeds to charity. Appiah believed that he "should save the drowning child and ruin my suit". In a 2015 debate, when presented with a similar scenario of either saving a child from a burning building or saving a Picasso painting to sell and donate the proceeds to charity, MacAskill responded that the effective altruist should save and sell the Picasso. Psychologist Alan Jern called MacAskill's choice "unnatural, even distasteful, to many people", although Jern concluded that effective altruism raises questions "worth asking". MacAskill later endorsed a "qualified definition of effective altruism" in which effective altruists try to do the most good "without violating constraints" such as any obligations that someone might have to help those nearby.

William Schambra has criticized the impartial logic of effective altruism, arguing that benevolence arising from reciprocity and face-to-face interactions is stronger and more prevalent than charity based on impartial, detached altruism. Such community-based charitable giving, he wrote, is foundational to civil society and, in turn, democracy. Larissa MacFarquhar said that people have diverse moral emotions, and she suggested that some effective altruists are not unemotional and detached but feel as much empathy for distant strangers as for people nearby. Richard Pettigrew concurred that many effective altruists "feel more profound dismay at the suffering of people unknown to them than many people feel", and he argued that impartiality in EA need not be dispassionate and "is not obviously in tension with much in care ethics" as some philosophers have argued. Ross Douthat of The New York Times criticized the movement's "'telescopic philanthropy' aimed at distant populations" and envisioned "effective altruists sitting around in a San Francisco skyscraper calculating how to relieve suffering halfway around the world while the city decays beneath them", while he also praised the movement for providing "useful rebukes to the solipsism and anti-human pessimism that haunts the developed world today".

=== Cause prioritization ===
A key component of effective altruism is "cause prioritization". Cause prioritization is based on the principle of cause neutrality, the idea that resources should be distributed to causes based on what will do the most good, irrespective of the identity of the beneficiary and the way in which they are helped. By contrast, many non-profits emphasize effectiveness and evidence with respect to a single cause such as education or climate change.

One tool that EA-based organizations may use to prioritize cause areas is the importance, tractability, and neglectedness framework. Importance is the amount of value that would be created if a problem were solved, tractability is the fraction of a problem that would be solved if additional resources were devoted to it, and neglectedness is the quantity of resources already committed to a cause.

The information required for cause prioritization may involve data analysis, comparing possible outcomes with what would have happened under other conditions (counterfactual reasoning), and identifying uncertainty. The difficulty of these tasks has led to the creation of organizations that specialize in researching the relative prioritization of causes.

==== Criticism of cause prioritization ====
This practice of "weighing causes and beneficiaries against one another" was criticized by Ken Berger and Robert Penna of Charity Navigator for being "moralistic, in the worst sense of the word" and "elitist". William MacAskill responded to Berger and Penna, defending the rationale for comparing one beneficiary's interests against another and concluding that such comparison is difficult and sometimes impossible but often necessary. MacAskill argued that the more pernicious form of elitism was that of donating to art galleries (and like institutions) instead of charity. Ian David Moss suggested that the criticism of cause prioritization could be resolved by what he called "domain-specific effective altruism", which would encourage "that principles of effective altruism be followed within an area of philanthropic focus, such as a specific cause or geography" and could resolve the conflict between local and global perspectives for some donors.

=== Cost-effectiveness ===
Some charities are considered to be far more effective than others, as charities may spend different amounts of money to achieve the same goal, and some charities may not achieve the goal at all. Effective altruists seek to identify interventions that are highly cost-effective in expectation. Many interventions have uncertain benefits, and the expected value of one intervention can be higher than that of another if its benefits are larger, even if it has a smaller chance of succeeding. One metric effective altruists use to choose between health interventions is the estimated number of quality-adjusted life years (QALY) added per dollar.

Some effective altruist organizations prefer randomized controlled trials as a primary form of evidence, as they are commonly considered the highest level of evidence in healthcare research. Others have argued that requiring this stringent level of evidence unnecessarily narrows the focus to issues where the evidence can be developed. Kelsey Piper argues that uncertainty is not a good reason for effective altruists to avoid acting on their best understanding of the world, because most interventions have mixed evidence regarding their effectiveness.

Pascal-Emmanuel Gobry and others have warned about the "measurement problem", with issues such as medical research or government reform worked on "one grinding step at a time", and results being hard to measure with controlled experiments. Gobry also argues that such interventions risk being undervalued by the effective altruism movement. As effective altruism emphasizes a data-centric approach, critics say principles which do not lend themselves to quantification—justice, fairness, equality—get left in the sidelines.

=== Counterfactual reasoning ===
Counterfactual reasoning involves considering the possible outcomes of alternative choices. It has been employed by effective altruists in a number of contexts, including career choice. Many people assume that the best way to help others is through direct methods, such as working for a charity or providing social services. However, since there is a high supply of candidates for such positions, it makes sense to compare the amount of good one candidate does to how much good the next-best candidate would do. According to this reasoning, the marginal impact of a career is likely to be smaller than the gross impact.

=== Differences from utilitarianism ===
MacAskill has argued that unlike utilitarianism, EA does not claim that people should always maximize the good regardless of the means or that well-being is the only source of intrinsic value. Toby Ord has described utilitarians as "number-crunching", compared with most effective altruists whom he called "guided by conventional wisdom tempered by an eye to the numbers". Other philosophers have argued that EA still retains some core ethical commitments that are essential and distinctive to utilitarianism, such as the principle of impartiality, welfarism and good-maximization.

MacAskill has argued that one should not be absolutely certain about which ethical view is correct, and that "when we are morally uncertain, we should act in a way that serves as a best compromise between different moral views". He also wrote that even from a purely consequentialist perspective, "naive calculations that justify some harmful action because it has good consequences are, in practice, almost never correct".

=== Differences from effective accelerationism ===
Effective accelerationism (abbreviated e/acc) is influenced by ideas of accelerationism. Its proponents advocate unrestricted technological progress in the hope that artificial general intelligence will solve major challenges and maximize overall good, arguing that deceleration and stagnation of technology is a greater risk than any posed by AI. Effective altruists are generally more cautious about AI, based on their belief that going too fast could increase existential risks.

== Cause priorities ==
The principles and goals of effective altruism are wide enough to support furthering any cause that allows people to do the most good, while taking into account cause neutrality. B.V.E. Hyde distinguishes between the effective altruist movement (EAM) and effective altruist theory (EAT) which, he argues, have very different focusses. Many people in the effective altruism movement have prioritized global health and development, animal welfare, and mitigating risks that threaten the future of humanity.

=== Global health and development ===
The alleviation of global poverty and neglected tropical diseases has been a focus of some of the earliest and most prominent organizations associated with effective altruism. Charity evaluator GiveWell was founded by Holden Karnofsky and Elie Hassenfeld in 2007 to address poverty, where they believe additional donations to be the most impactful. GiveWell's leading recommendations include: malaria prevention charities Against Malaria Foundation and Malaria Consortium, deworming charities Schistosomiasis Control Initiative and Deworm the World Initiative, and GiveDirectly for direct cash transfers to beneficiaries. The organization The Life You Can Save, which originated from Singer's book The Life You Can Save, works to alleviate global poverty by promoting evidence-backed charities, conducting philanthropy education, and changing the culture of giving in affluent countries.

=== Animal welfare ===
Improving animal welfare has been a focus of many effective altruists. Singer and Animal Charity Evaluators (ACE) have argued that effective altruists should prioritize changes to factory farming over pet welfare. Over 80 billion land animals are slaughtered and between 1 and 2.7 trillion individual fish are killed each year for human consumption. A number of non-profit organizations have been established that adopt an effective altruist approach toward animal welfare. ACE evaluates animal charities based on their cost-effectiveness and transparency, particularly those tackling factory farming. Faunalytics focuses on animal welfare research. Other animal initiatives affiliated with effective altruism include Animal Ethics' and Wild Animal Initiative's work on wild animal suffering, addressing farm animal suffering with cultured meat, and increasing concern for all kinds of animals. The Sentience Institute is a think tank founded to expand the moral circle to other sentient beings.

=== Long-term future and global catastrophic risks ===
The ethical stance of longtermism, emphasizing the importance of positively influencing the long-term future, developed closely in relation to effective altruism. Longtermism argues that "distance in time is like distance in space", suggesting that the welfare of future individuals matters as much as the welfare of currently existing individuals. Given the potentially extremely high number of individuals that could exist in the future, longtermists seek to decrease the probability that an existential catastrophe irreversibly ruins it. Toby Ord has stated that "the people of the future may be even more powerless to protect themselves from the risks we impose than the dispossessed of our own time".

Existential risks, such as dangers associated with biotechnology and advanced artificial intelligence, are often highlighted and the subject of active research. Existential risks have such huge impacts that achieving a very small change in such a risk—say a 0.0001-percent reduction—"might be worth more than saving a billion people today", reported Gideon Lewis-Kraus in 2022, but he added that nobody in the EA community openly endorses such an extreme conclusion.

Organizations devoted to working on research and advocacy for improving the long-term future, and connected to the effective altruism community, include the Centre for the Study of Existential Risk at the University of Cambridge, the Future of Life Institute, and the now-defunct Future of Humanity Institute at the University of Oxford. In addition, the Machine Intelligence Research Institute is focused on the more narrow mission of managing advanced artificial intelligence.

==== S-risks ====
Some effective altruists focus on reducing risks of astronomical suffering (s-risks). S-risks are a particularly severe type of existential risk due to their potential scope and severity, surpassing even human extinction in negative impact. Efforts to mitigate these risks include research and advocacy by organizations like the Center on Long-Term Risk, which explores strategies to avoid large-scale suffering. S-risks could arise from a long-term neglect for the welfare of some types of sentient beings. Another suggested scenario involves repressive totalitarian regimes that would become irreversibly stable due to advanced technology.

== Approaches ==
Effective altruists pursue different approaches to doing good, such as donating to effective charitable organizations, using their career to make more money for donations or directly contributing their labor, and starting new non-profit or for-profit ventures.

=== Donation ===
==== Financial donation ====
Many effective altruists engage in charitable donation. Some believe it is a moral duty to alleviate suffering through donations if other possible uses of those funds do not offer comparable benefits to oneself. Some lead a frugal lifestyle in order to donate more. Giving What We Can (GWWC) is an organization whose members pledge to donate at least 10% of their future income to the causes that they believe are the most effective. GWWC was founded in 2009 by Toby Ord, who lives on £18,000 ($27,000) per year and donates the balance of his income. In 2020, Ord said that people had donated over $100 million to date through the GWWC pledge. Founders Pledge is a similar initiative, founded out of the non-profit Founders Forum for Good, whereby entrepreneurs make a legally binding commitment to donate a percentage of their personal proceeds to charity in the event that they sell their business. As of April 2024, nearly 1,900 entrepreneurs had pledged around $10 billion and nearly $1.1 billion had been donated.

==== Organ donation ====
EA has been used to argue that humans should donate organs, whilst alive or after death, and some effective altruists do.

=== Career choice ===
Effective altruists often consider using their career to do good, both by direct service and indirectly through their consumption, investment, and donation decisions. 80,000 Hours is an organization that conducts research and gives advice on which careers have the largest positive impact.

==== Earning to give ====
Earning to give involves deliberately pursuing a high-earning career for the purpose of donating a significant portion of earned income, typically because of a desire to do effective altruism. Advocates of earning to give contend that maximizing the amount one can donate to charity is an important consideration for individuals when deciding what career to pursue.

=== Open-source contributions and open collaboration ===
Open-source software development has been used by organizations associated with effective altruism. Effective altruism events have included collaborative hackathons; EAGxBerkeley 2022, for example, included a post-conference hackathon.

Open-source software has been studied as the voluntary provision of a public good, since contributors invest effort in software that can subsequently be used and further developed by others. Research examining the motivations of open-source contributors has also found altruism to be an important motivation for participation.

=== Founding effective organizations ===
Some effective altruists start non-profit or for-profit organizations to implement cost-effective ways of doing good. On the non-profit side, for example, Michael Kremer and Rachel Glennerster conducted randomized controlled trials in Kenya to find out the best way to improve students' test scores. They tried new textbooks and flip charts, as well as smaller class sizes, but found that the only intervention that raised school attendance was treating intestinal worms in children. Based on their findings, they started the Deworm the World Initiative. From 2013 to August 2022, GiveWell designated Deworm the World (now run by nonprofit Evidence Action) as a top charity based on their assessment that mass deworming is "generally highly cost-effective"; however, there is substantial uncertainty about the benefits of mass deworming programs, with some studies finding long-term effects and others not. The Happier Lives Institute conducts research on the effectiveness of cognitive behavioral therapy (CBT) in developing countries; Canopie develops an app that provides cognitive behavioural therapy to women who are expecting or postpartum; Giving Green analyzes and ranks climate interventions for effectiveness; the Fish Welfare Initiative works on improving animal welfare in fishing and aquaculture; and the Lead Exposure Elimination Project works on reducing lead poisoning in developing countries.

== Psychological research ==
Researchers in psychology and related fields have identified psychological barriers to effective altruism that can cause people to choose other options when they engage in altruistic activities such as charitable giving.

== Criticism and controversies ==
=== Incremental versus systemic change ===
While much of the initial focus of effective altruism was on direct strategies such as health interventions and cash transfers, more systematic social, economic, and political reforms have also attracted attention. Mathew Snow in Jacobin wrote that effective altruism "implores individuals to use their money to procure necessities for those who desperately need them, but says nothing about the system that determines how those necessities are produced and distributed in the first place". Philosopher Amia Srinivasan criticized William MacAskill's Doing Good Better for a perceived lack of coverage of global inequality and oppression, while noting that effective altruism is in principle open to whichever means of doing good is most effective, including political advocacy aimed at systemic change. Srinivasan said, "Effective altruism has so far been a rather homogeneous movement of middle-class white men fighting poverty through largely conventional means, but it is at least in theory a broad church." Judith Lichtenberg in The New Republic said that effective altruists "neglect the kind of structural and political change that is ultimately necessary". An article in The Ecologist published in 2016 argued that effective altruism is an apolitical attempt to solve political problems, describing the concept as "pseudo-scientific". The Ethiopian-American AI scientist Timnit Gebru has condemned effective altruists "for acting as though their concerns are above structural issues as racism and colonialism", as Gideon Lewis-Kraus summarized her views in 2022.

Philosophers such as Susan Dwyer, Joshua Stein, and Olúfẹ́mi O. Táíwò have criticized effective altruism for furthering the disproportionate influence of wealthy individuals in domains that should be the responsibility of democratic governments and organizations. Arguments have been made that movements focused on systemic or institutional change, for example democratization, are compatible with effective altruism. Philosopher Elizabeth Ashford posits that people are obligated to both donate to effective aid charities and to reform the structures that are responsible for poverty. Open Philanthropy has given grants for progressive advocacy work in areas such as criminal justice, economic stabilization, and housing reform, despite pegging the success of political reform as being "highly uncertain".

=== Sam Bankman-Fried ===
Sam Bankman-Fried, the eventual founder of the cryptocurrency exchange FTX, had a lunch with philosopher William MacAskill in 2012 while he was an undergraduate at MIT in which MacAskill encouraged him to go earn money and donate it, rather than volunteering his time for causes. Bankman-Fried went on to a career in investing and around 2019 became more publicly associated with the effective altruism movement, announcing that his goal was to "donate as much as [he] can". Bankman-Fried founded the FTX Future Fund, which brought on MacAskill as one of its advisers, and which made a $13.9 million grant to the Centre for Effective Altruism where MacAskill holds a board role.

After the collapse of FTX in late 2022, the movement underwent additional public scrutiny. Bankman-Fried's relationship with effective altruism damaged the movement's reputation. Some journalists asked whether the effective altruist movement was complicit in FTX's collapse, because it was convenient for leaders to overlook specific warnings about Bankman-Fried's behavior or questionable ethics at the trading firm Alameda. Fortune's crypto editor Jeff John Roberts said that "Bankman-Fried and his cronies professed devotion to 'EA,' but all their high-minded words turned out to be flimflam to justify robbing people". MacAskill condemned Bankman-Fried's actions, saying that effective altruism emphasizes integrity. Philosopher Leif Wenar argued that Bankman-Fried's conduct typified much of the movement by focusing on positive impacts and expected value without adequately weighing risk and harm from philanthropy. He argued that the FTX case is not separable, as some in the EA community maintained, from the assumptions and reasoning that molded effective altruism as a philosophy in the first place—assumptions and reasoning that Wenar considered to be simplistic.

=== Sexual misconduct accusations ===
Critiques also arose concerning issues of exclusion and sexual harassment. A 2023 Bloomberg article featured some members of the effective altruism community who alleged that the philosophy masked a culture of predatory behavior. In a 2023 Time magazine article, seven women reported misconduct and controversy in the effective altruism movement. They accused men within the movement, typically in the San Francisco Bay Area, of using their power to groom younger women for polyamorous sexual relationships. The accusers argued that the majority male demographic and the polyamorous subculture combined to create an environment where sexual misconduct was tolerated, excused or rationalized away. In response to the accusations, the Centre for Effective Altruism told Time that some of the alleged perpetrators had already been banned from the organization and said it would investigate new claims. The organization also argued that it is challenging to discern to what extent sexual misconduct issues were specific to the effective altruism community or reflective of broader societal misogyny.

=== OpenAI ===
Sam Altman, the CEO of OpenAI, has called effective altruism an "incredibly flawed movement" that shows "very weird emergent behavior". Effective altruist concerns about AI risk were present among the OpenAI board members who fired Altman in November 2023; he has since been reinstated as CEO and the Board membership has changed.

=== TESCREAL ===
Timnit Gebru and Émile P. Torres argue that the effective altruism movement belongs to a network of interconnected movements they've termed TESCREAL, which they contend serves as intellectual justification for wealthy donors to shape humanity's future. Gebru has also claimed that effective altruism has acted to overrule any other concerns regarding AI ethics (e.g. deepfake porn, algorithmic bias), in the name of either preventing or controlling artificial general intelligence.

== See also ==
- Charity (practice) – Voluntary giving of help to those in need
- Charity evaluator – Analysis of effectiveness of non-profit organizations
- Empathy-altruism – Form of altruism based on moral emotion
- Evidence-based policy – Approach to decision-making and policy based on empirical data and analysis
- Impact investing – Investing for socio-environmental impact and profit
- Noblesse oblige – Concept that nobility confers social responsibilities
- Patronage – Support that one organization or individual bestows to another
- Prosocial behavior – Intent to benefit others
- Scientific Charity Movement – Defunct anti-poverty movement
- Speciesism – Philosophical term on species treatment
- Suffering risks – Scenarios of large amounts of future suffering
- The Giving Pledge – Charitable campaign
- "The Gospel of Wealth" – Article written by Andrew Carnegie
