= Toby Ord =

Australian philosopher (born 1979)

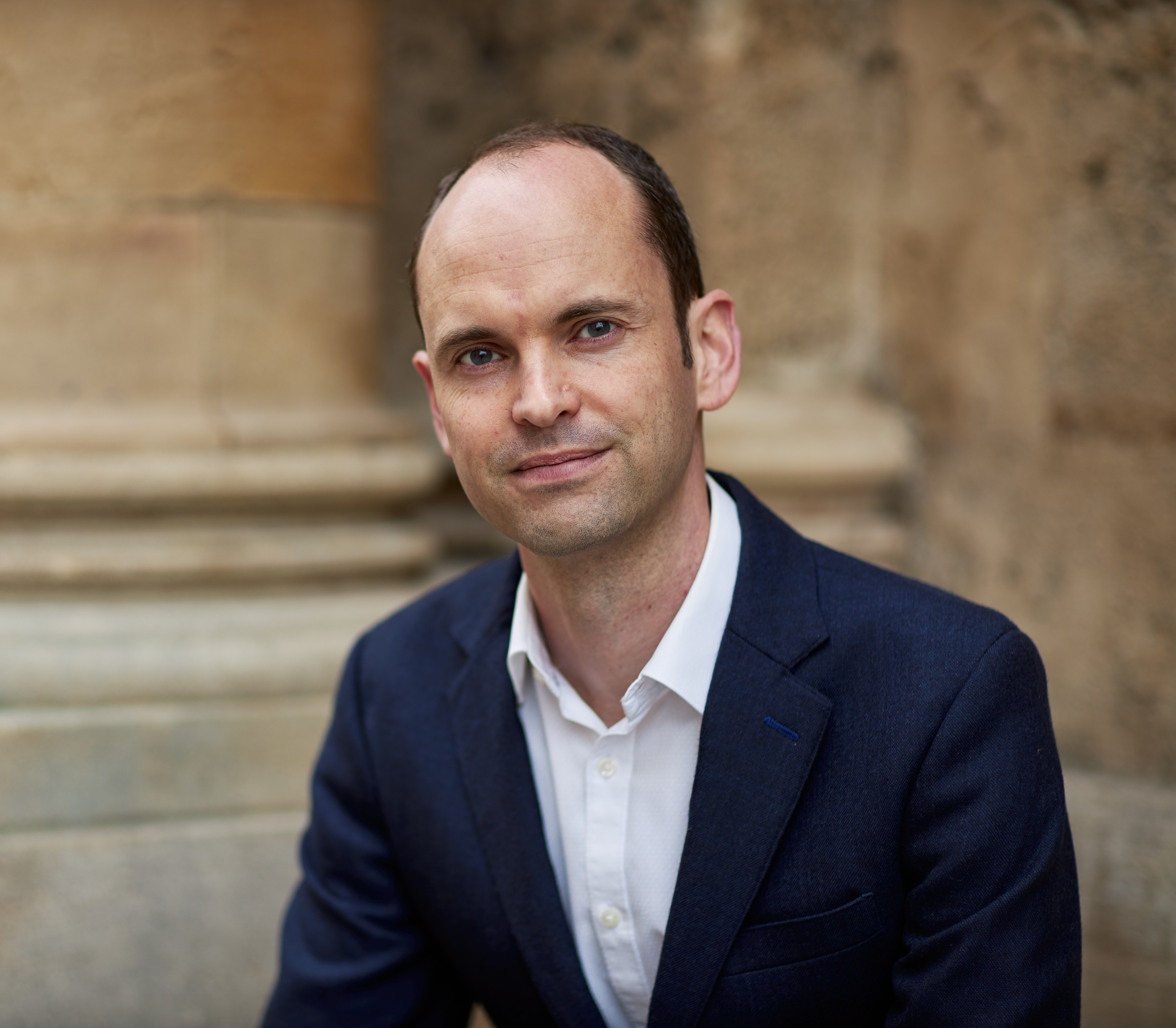
- Ord in 2019
- Born: Toby David Godfrey Ord; July 1979 (age 47); Melbourne, Australia
- Spouse: Bernadette Young

Education
- Education: University of Melbourne; Balliol College, Oxford; Christ Church, Oxford
- Thesis: Beyond Action: Applying Consequentialism to Decision Making and Motivation (2009)
- Doctoral advisors: John Broome; Derek Parfit

Philosophical work
- Era: Contemporary philosophy
- School: Analytic philosophy; Effective altruism; Consequentialism
- Institutions: Balliol College, Oxford; Giving What We Can; Future of Humanity Institute; Centre for Effective Altruism; 80,000 Hours
- Main interests: Normative ethics; practical ethics; existential risk
- Notable ideas: Longtermism; Moral trade; Moral uncertainty; Reversal test
- Website: www.tobyord.com

Toby David Godfrey Ord (born July 1979) is an Australian philosopher. In 2009 he founded Giving What We Can, an international society whose members pledge to donate at least 10% of their income to effective charities, and is a key figure in the effective altruism movement, which promotes using reason and evidence to help the lives of others as much as possible.

He was a senior research fellow at Oxford University's Future of Humanity Institute, where his work focused on existential risk. His book on the subject, The Precipice: Existential Risk and the Future of Humanity, was published in March 2020.

== Early life and education ==
Ord was born in Melbourne, Australia, in 1979. He later attended the University of Melbourne, where he initially studied computer science. On completing his first degree, he switched to studying philosophy to pursue his interest in ethics, later stating: "At this stage I knew that I wanted to make a large positive difference in the world and it seemed that studying ethics would help."

For his graduate studies, Ord moved to the University of Oxford, where he obtained a B.Phil., and a D.Phil. in philosophy. Having submitted his doctoral thesis, Beyond Action: Applying Consequentialism to Decision Making and Motivation, Ord was retained as a junior research fellow by Balliol College, Oxford.

== Career ==
Ord held the position of research fellow at Oxford's Future of Humanity Institute from 2014 until 2019, and senior research fellow from 2019 until the institute's shutdown in 2024. Ord describes his focus as "the big picture questions facing humanity." He is a trustee of the Centre for Effective Altruism and of the non-profit organization 80,000 Hours, researching careers that have the largest positive social impact and providing career advice based on that research.

=== Research ===
==== Ethics ====
Ord's work has been primarily in moral philosophy. In applied ethics, he has worked on bioethics, the demands of morality, and global priority setting. He has also made contributions in global health, as an advisor to the third edition of Disease Control Priorities Project. In normative ethics, his research has focused on consequentialism and on moral uncertainty.

==== Existential risk ====
Ord's current main research interest is existential risk. His book on the topic The Precipice: Existential Risk and the Future of Humanity was published in March 2020. The New Yorker characterizes Ord's research motivation as follows:

A concern for existential risk seemed, to Ord, to be the next logical expansion of a broadening moral circle. If we can learn to value the lives of people in other places and circumstances equally to our own, then we can do the same for people situated at a different moment in time. Those future people, whose quality of life and very existence will be intimately affected by our choices today, matter as much as we do.

==== Hypercomputation ====
Ord has written papers on the viability and potentials for hypercomputation, models of computation that can provide outputs that are not Turing-computable such as a machine that could solve the halting problem.

=== Giving What We Can ===
At Oxford, Ord resolved to give a significant proportion of his income to the most cost-effective charities he could find. Following a number of enquiries from people interested in making a similar commitment, Ord, alongside co-founders Bernadette Young and William MacAskill, decided to set up an organisation geared towards supporting like-minded donors. In 2009, Ord launched Giving What We Can, an international society whose members have each pledged to donate at least 10% of their income to the most cost-effective charities. The organisation is aligned with, and part of, the effective altruism movement. Giving What We Can seeks not only to encourage people to give more of their money to charity but also stresses the importance of giving to the most cost-effective ones, arguing that "you can often do 100x more good with your dollar by donating to the best charities." By July 2024, Giving What We Can had grown to over 9,000 members, who have already donated $253 million to effective charities.

Ord himself decided initially to cap his income at £20,000 per year, and to give away everything he earned above that to well-researched charities. A year later, he revised this figure down to £18,000. This threshold rises annually with inflation. As of December 2019, he had donated £106,000, or 28 percent of his income. Over the course of his career, he expects his donations to total around £1 million.

== Personal life ==
Ord lives in Oxford with his wife, Bernadette Young, a medical doctor.

== Bibliography ==
=== Books ===
- 2020 – The Precipice: Existential Risk and the Future of Humanity, Toby Ord, ISBN 0316484911
- 2020 – Moral Uncertainty, William MacAskill, Krister Byvist, & Toby Ord, ISBN 0198722273

=== Journal articles (selected) ===
- 2019 – Ord, Toby (2019). "An upper bound for the background rate of human extinction". Scientific Reports. 9 (1) 11054. Bibcode:2019NatSR...911054S. doi:10.1038/s41598-019-47540-7. PMC 6667434. PMID 31363134.
- 2018 – Sandberg, Anders; Drexler, Eric; Ord, Toby (2018). "Dissolving the Fermi Paradox". arXiv:1806.02404 [physics.pop-ph].
- 2015 – Ord, Toby. "Moral Trade". Ethics. 126.
- 2014 – Beckstead, Nick; Ord, Toby. Managing Existential Risk from Emerging Technologies (Report). Government Office for Science.
- 2014 – Ord, Toby (6 February 2014). "Global poverty and the demands of morality". In Perry, J (ed.). God, The Good, and Utilitarianism: Perspectives on Peter Singer. CUP. ISBN 978-1107050754.
- 2013 – Ord, Toby. The Moral Imperative toward Cost-Effectiveness in Global Health (Report).
- 2010 – Ord, Toby; Hillerbrand, Rafaela; Sandberg, Anders (2008). "Probing the improbable: methodological challenges for risks with low probabilities and high stakes". Journal of Risk Research. 13. arXiv:0810.5515. Bibcode:2008arXiv0810.5515O.
- 2006 – Bostrom, Nick; Ord, Toby (2006). "The reversal test: eliminating status quo bias in applied ethics". Ethics. 116 (4): 656–79. doi:10.1086/505233. PMID 17039628. S2CID 12861892.

== See also ==
- Reversal test
- Nick Bostrom
- William MacAskill
