= Leif Wenar =

American Philosopher

- Occupations: Olive H. Palmer Professor of Humanities, Professor of Philosophy, and by courtesy, Professor of Law

Academic background
- Education: Harvard University (PhD), Stanford University (AB)

Academic work
- Discipline: Philosopher
- Institutions: Stanford University
- Main interests: Ethics

Leif Wenar is an American philosopher and Olive H. Palmer Professor in Humanities at Stanford University. He is known for his work on political science. Wenar has an AB in philosophy from Stanford and a PhD in philosophy from Harvard University. From 2008 to 2020 he held the Chair of Philosophy & Law at King’s College London. In March 2024, he wrote an article for Wired magazine critiquing the effective altruism movement called "The Deaths of Effective Altruism."

== Books ==
- Blood Oil: Tyrants, Violence, and the Rules that Run the World (2016)
- Beyond Blood Oil: Philosophy, Policy, and the Future (2018)
