= Dylan Matthews =

American journalist

- Education: Harvard University (BA)
- Occupation: Journalist
- Notable work: Future Perfect

Dylan Matthews is an American journalist. He is a program officer at Coefficient Giving. He previously worked as a correspondent for Vox from 2014 to 2025.

== Professional life ==
=== Early writing ===
In 2004, at the age of 14, Matthews launched a personal blog on politics and other issues under the name minipundit. Matthews graduated from Hanover High School in Hanover, New Hampshire, in 2008. He went on to Harvard University, where he studied social and political philosophy, and also wrote for The Harvard Crimson.

=== The Washington Post ===
Between June 2013 and January 2014, Matthews blogged at the Wonkblog section of The Washington Post, focusing on taxes, budgets, and other elements of US economic and fiscal policy.

In October 2013, Wonkblog journalist Ezra Klein and Matthews spearheaded the launch of "Know More", a new blog under The Washington Post targeted at replicating the viral reach of popular websites such as BuzzFeed. The project's success gained Matthews recognition internally in The Washington Post and externally. Matthews won The Washington Post "Publisher's Award" of October 2013 for his work on Know More. A leaked internal memo from The Washington Post publisher Katharine Weymouth announcing the award stated:

At its heart, KnowMore is Dylan Matthews.

Dylan is the writer and producer—but more than that, the sensibility—behind KnowMore, which is a blog aimed at drawing attention to the very best work offered by the Post and also by other publications. Conceived by Ezra Klein as a way to extend the Wonkblog brand further into social media, built by Yuri Victor and sustained with help from the whole Wonkblog crew, KnowMore is not trolling for cheap clicks. The idea is to grab readers' attention and draw them into deeper reading about substantive subjects (OK, plus the occasional silly diversion).

After launching Oct. 7, KnowMore rocketed to the top echelons of Post blogs. On some days, KnowMore draws more traffic than Wonkblog. For the third week of October—the third week of its existence—KnowMore was the No.1 most-read blog on all of washingtonpost.com. It is consistently in the top five.

When interviewed about the strategy of the project, Matthews suggested it was primarily about publishing content that would be shared and virally-distributed on Facebook: "The most obvious similarity [to BuzzFeed and Upworthy] there is in targeting Facebook rather than Twitter. If you look at any site that does well socially, there's just a handful that get their traffic from Twitter. Journalists sometimes forget this because we tend to really like Twitter."

Responding to negative comparisons with BuzzFeed, Matthews said: "It really irks me when people act like they're better than BuzzFeed, which is an extremely effective journalism outfit—much better than most at being honestly what people are looking for." Klein also rejected direct comparisons to "clickbait", arguing: "There's this idea that there's this thing called click-bait that everybody wants to click on. If I could figure out what that is and get people to click on good content—my god, what a wonderful thing!"

=== Vox.com ===
In late January 2014, Klein and Matthews announced that they, along with Matthew Yglesias and Melissa Bell, would be starting a new online media venture with Vox Media. The venture, named Vox.com, launched in early April 2014, and Matthews wrote his first article for the site in April 2014. The scientific research Matthews reported on in that article turned out to be fraudulent, and 13 months later he wrote a mea culpa article about the fraud and how he was deceived by it. Matthews leads the Vox section Future Perfect, dedicated to effective altruism.

=== Coefficient Giving ===
Matthews left Vox to join Coefficient Giving in December 2025 as associate program officer of the Abundance & Growth fund.

=== Other ===
Matthews has also written for Salon and The New Republic and has appeared on the now defunct Bloggingheads.tv. His writings have covered basic income, immigration policy, effective altruism, among other topics.

Matthews is on the advisory board of the Journal of Economic Perspectives, an economic journal published by the American Economic Association.

== Reception ==
Matthews was listed as one of "five rising stars under 25" in Politics Daily by Katie Glueck in 2010. Matthews is noted for his use of data visualizations in his publications.

Charity evaluator and effective altruism advocate GiveWell published a conversation with Matthews from when he was still working for The Washington Post Wonkblog section.

In 2016, the Autistic Self Advocacy Network recognized Matthews as the most outstanding autistic journalist of the year by presenting him with the Harriet McBryde Johnson Award for Non-Fiction Writing.

== Personal life ==
In 2017, Matthews donated his kidney for transplantation. He described the experience in a Vox article, in which he also encouraged readers to consider live kidney donation.

Matthews identifies with the effective altruism movement and is a member of Giving What We Can, a community of people who have pledged to give at least 10% of their income to effective charities.
