= Famine, Affluence, and Morality =

1971 essay by Peter Singer

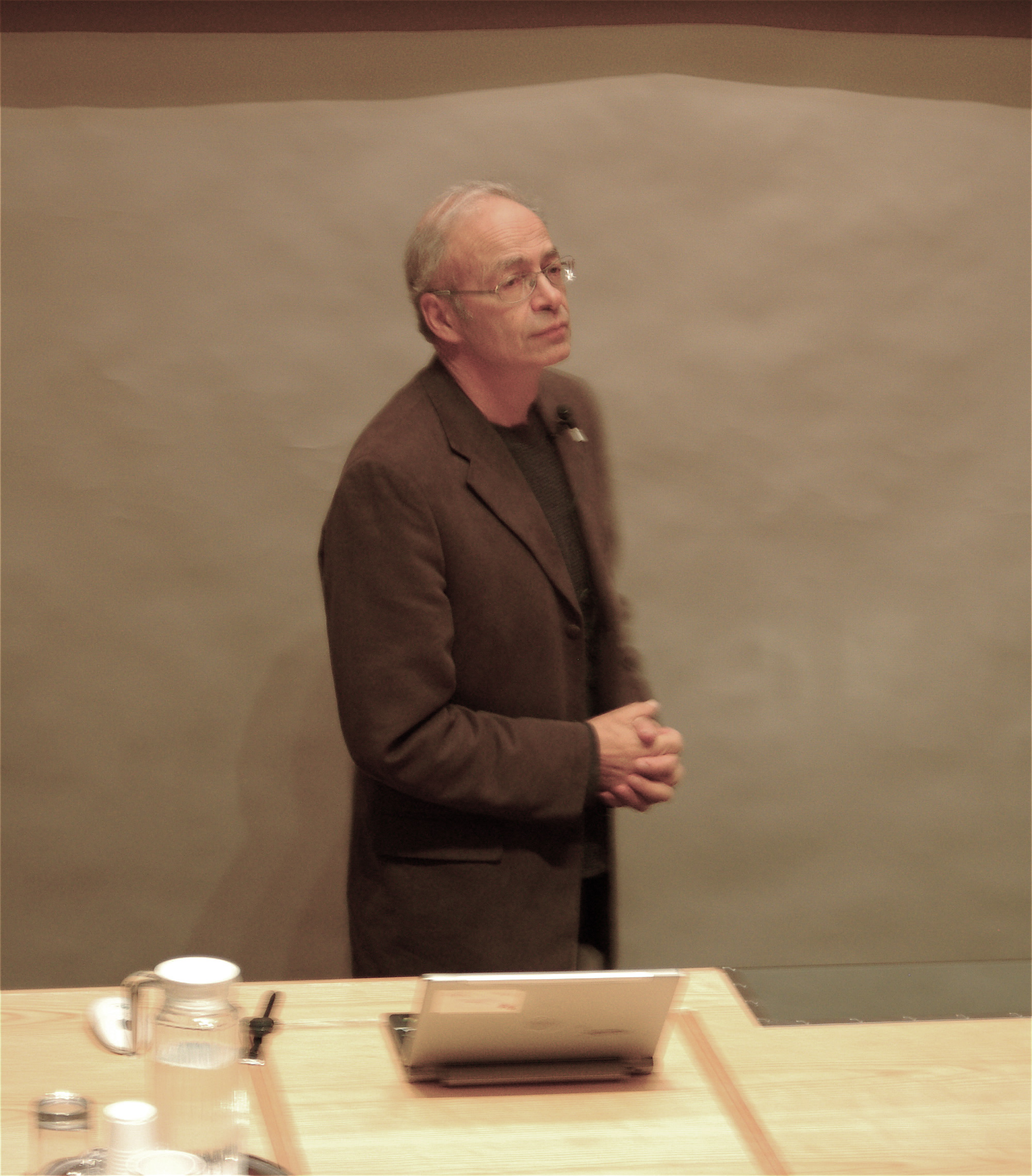
Peter Singer

"Famine, Affluence, and Morality" is an essay written by Peter Singer in 1971 and published in Philosophy & Public Affairs in 1972. It argues that affluent persons are morally obligated to donate far more resources to humanitarian causes than is considered normal in Western cultures. The essay was inspired by the starvation of Bangladesh Liberation War refugees, and uses their situation as an example, although Singer's argument is general in scope and not limited to the example of Bangladesh. The essay is anthologized widely as an example of Western ethical thinking.

== Summary ==
One of the core arguments of this essay is that, if one can use one's wealth to reduce suffering—for example, by aiding famine-relief efforts—without any significant reduction in the well-being of oneself or others, it is immoral not to do so. Singer raises a drowning child analogy in his essay: inaction is clearly immoral if a child is drowning in a shallow pond and someone can save them but chooses not to. If saving the child would mean "getting my clothes muddy", this is not of "comparable moral importance", as the death of the child would "presumably be a very bad thing". He argues further that placing greater geographical distance between the person in need and the potential helper does not reduce the latter's moral obligations:

It makes no moral difference whether the person I can help is a neighbor's child ten yards away from me or a Bengali whose name I shall never know, ten thousand miles away. ... The moral point of view requires us to look beyond the interests of our own society. Previously, ... this may hardly have been feasible, but it is quite feasible now. From the moral point of view, the prevention of the starvation of millions of people outside our society must be considered at least as pressing as the upholding of property norms within our society.

The affluent, says Singer, are consistently guilty of failing to recognize this, having large amounts of surplus wealth that they do not use to aid humanitarian projects in developing nations.

Here is the thrust of Singer's argument:

- "Suffering and death from lack of food, shelter and medical care are bad".
- "If it is in our power to prevent something bad from happening, without thereby sacrificing anything of comparable moral importance, then we ought, morally, to do it".
- "It makes no moral difference whether the person I can help is a neighbor's child ten yards from me or a Bengali whose name I shall never know, ten thousand miles away".
- "The principle makes no distinction between cases in which I am the only person who could possibly do anything and cases in which I am just one among millions in the same position".

== Reception and criticism ==
=== Support ===
Philosopher Gilbert Harman considered "Famine, Affluence, and Morality" to be "one of the most famous articles written in moral philosophy", as Helga Kuhse summarized Harman's view. In 1981, philosopher James Rachels said of the article: "one felt intellectual interest in the argument, but also guilt for not having contributed more money to relieve starvation". Singer's article inspired the writing of Peter Unger's 1996 book Living High and Letting Die.

Philosopher William MacAskill was influenced by the essay, which he encountered in an undergraduate seminar; MacAskill later went on to be a founder of the effective altruism movement. In 2015, The New Republic noted the influence of Singer's essay on effective altruism. The "drowning child" analogy informs the title of the 2015 book Strangers Drowning by Larissa MacFarquhar, which documents the lives of various extreme altruists, some of whom were influenced by Singer's essay.

=== Criticism and broader consideration ===
A common criticism of Singer's essay is the demandingness objection. For example, the "supposed obligation" of Singer's essay has been criticised by John Arthur in 1982, by John Kekes in 2002, and by Kwame Anthony Appiah in 2006, and Singer's claim of a straight path from commonsense morality to great giving has also been disputed.

In a review for the Financial Times upon the release of the 2016 book version of Singer's essay, Daniel Ben-Ami argued that the key to eradicating poverty lies not only in charitable efforts but also in fostering a sense of agency among the impoverished. He gave the example of how China lifted millions out of poverty by transforming its economy, rather than being dependent on western aid and sympathy. He argued that people who wish to aid famine relief or poverty alleviation should have the freedom to do so. However, it is important to avoid perceiving the impoverished as mere passive beneficiaries of Western charity. Such a perspective should be resisted, as it overlooks their agency and potential to contribute actively to their own betterment.

== See also ==
- Bangladesh famine of 1974
- Lockean proviso
- Doing Good Better by William MacAskill, 2015
- The Life You Can Save by Peter Singer, 2009
