= Future of Humanity Institute =

2005–2024 Oxford University research centre

- Formation: 2005; 21 years ago
- Dissolved: 16 April 2024; 2 years ago
- Purpose: Research big-picture questions about humanity and its prospects
- Headquarters: Oxford, England
- Director: Nick Bostrom
- Parent organization: Faculty of Philosophy, University of Oxford
- Website: futureofhumanityinstitute.org

The Future of Humanity Institute (FHI) was an interdisciplinary research centre at the University of Oxford investigating big-picture questions about humanity and its prospects. It was founded in 2005 as part of the Faculty of Philosophy and the Oxford Martin School. Its director was philosopher Nick Bostrom, and its research staff included futurist Anders Sandberg and Giving What We Can founder Toby Ord.

Sharing an office and working closely with the Centre for Effective Altruism, the institute's stated objective was to focus research where it can make the greatest positive difference for humanity in the long term. It engaged in a mix of academic and outreach activities, seeking to promote informed discussion and public engagement in government, businesses, universities, and other organizations. The centre's largest research funders included Amlin, Elon Musk, the European Research Council, Future of Life Institute, and Leverhulme Trust.

On 16 April 2024 the University of Oxford closed the Institute, which said it had "faced increasing administrative headwinds within the Faculty of Philosophy".

== History ==
Nick Bostrom established the institute in November 2005 as part of the Oxford Martin School, then the James Martin 21st Century School. Between 2008 and 2010, FHI hosted the Global Catastrophic Risks conference, wrote 22 academic journal articles, and published 34 chapters in academic volumes. FHI researchers have given policy advice at the World Economic Forum, to the private and non-profit sector (such as the Macarthur Foundation, and the World Health Organization), as well as to governmental bodies in Sweden, Singapore, Belgium, the United Kingdom, and the United States.

Bostrom and bioethicist Julian Savulescu also published the book Human Enhancement in March 2009. Most recently, FHI has focused on the dangers of advanced artificial intelligence (AI). In 2014, its researchers published several books on AI risk, including Stuart Armstrong's Smarter Than Us and Bostrom's Superintelligence: Paths, Dangers, Strategies.

In 2018, Open Philanthropy recommended a grant of up to approximately £13.4 million to FHI over three years, with a large portion conditional on successful hiring.

== Existential risk ==
The largest topic FHI has spent time exploring is global catastrophic risk, and in particular existential risk. In a 2002 paper, Bostrom defined an "existential risk" as one "where an adverse outcome would either annihilate Earth-originating intelligent life or permanently and drastically curtail its potential". This includes scenarios where humanity is not directly harmed, but it fails to colonize space and make use of the observable universe's available resources in humanly valuable projects, as discussed in Bostrom's 2003 paper, "Astronomical Waste: The Opportunity Cost of Delayed Technological Development".

Bostrom and Milan Ćirković's 2008 book Global Catastrophic Risks collects essays on a variety of such risks, both natural and anthropogenic. Possible catastrophic risks from nature include super-volcanism, impact events, and energetic astronomical events such as gamma-ray bursts, cosmic rays, solar flares, and supernovae. These dangers are characterized as relatively small and relatively well understood, though pandemics may be exceptions as a result of being more common, and of dovetailing with technological trends.

Synthetic pandemics via weaponized biological agents are given more attention by FHI. Technological outcomes the institute is particularly interested in include anthropogenic climate change, nuclear warfare and nuclear terrorism, molecular nanotechnology, and artificial general intelligence. In expecting the largest risks to stem from future technologies, and from advanced artificial intelligence in particular, FHI agrees with other existential risk reduction organizations, such as the Centre for the Study of Existential Risk and the Machine Intelligence Research Institute. FHI researchers have also studied the impact of technological progress on social and institutional risks, such as totalitarianism, automation-driven unemployment, and information hazards.

In 2020, FHI Senior Research Fellow Toby Ord published his book The Precipice: Existential Risk and the Future of Humanity, in which he argues that safeguarding humanity's future is among the most important moral issues of our time.

== Anthropic reasoning ==
FHI devotes much of its attention to exotic threats that have been little explored by other organizations, and to methodological considerations that inform existential risk reduction and forecasting. The institute has particularly emphasized anthropic reasoning in its research, as an under-explored area with general epistemological implications.

Anthropic arguments FHI has studied include the doomsday argument, which claims that humanity is likely to go extinct soon because it is unlikely that one is observing a point in human history that is extremely early. Instead, present-day humans are likely to be near the middle of the distribution of humans that will ever live. Bostrom has also popularized the simulation argument.

A recurring theme in FHI's research is the Fermi paradox, the surprising absence of observable alien civilizations. Robin Hanson has argued that there must be a "Great Filter" preventing space colonization to account for the paradox. That filter may lie in the past, if intelligence is much more rare than current biology would predict; or it may lie in the future, if existential risks are even larger than is currently recognized.

== Human enhancement and rationality ==
Closely linked to FHI's work on risk assessment, astronomical waste, and the dangers of future technologies is its work on the promise and risks of human enhancement. The modifications in question may be biological, digital, or sociological, and an emphasis is placed on the most radical hypothesized changes, rather than on the likeliest short-term innovations. FHI's bioethics research focuses on the potential consequences of gene therapy, life extension, brain implants and brain–computer interfaces, and mind uploading.

FHI's focus has been on methods for assessing and enhancing human intelligence and rationality, as a way of shaping the speed and direction of technological and social progress. FHI's work on human irrationality, as exemplified in cognitive heuristics and biases, includes an ongoing collaboration with Amlin to study the systemic risk arising from biases in modeling.

== Selected publications ==
- Toby Ord: The Precipice: Existential Risk and the Future of Humanity, 2020. ISBN 1526600218
- Nick Bostrom: Superintelligence: Paths, Dangers, Strategies, 2014. ISBN 0-415-93858-9
- Nick Bostrom and Milan Ćirković: Global Catastrophic Risks, 2011. ISBN 978-0-19-857050-9
- Nick Bostrom and Julian Savulescu: Human Enhancement, 2011. ISBN 0-19-929972-2
- Nick Bostrom: Anthropic Bias: Observation Selection Effects in Science and Philosophy, 2010. ISBN 0-415-93858-9
- Nick Bostrom and Anders Sandberg: Brain Emulation Roadmap, 2008.

== See also ==
- Future of Life Institute
- Futures studies
- Leverhulme Centre for the Future of Intelligence
- Effective altruism
