= What We Owe the Future =

2022 book by William MacAskill

- First edition cover
- Author: William MacAskill
- Audio read by: William MacAskill
- Language: English
- Subject: Effective altruism; longtermism; ethics; existential risk
- Genre: Philosophy
- Publisher: Basic Books, Oneworld Publications
- Publication date: August 16, 2022
- Publication place: United States
- Media type: Print; Audiobook; E-book
- Pages: 352
- ISBN: 978-1-5416-1862-6
- OCLC: 1288137842
- Website: whatweowethefuture.com

What We Owe the Future is a 2022 book by the Scottish philosopher and ethicist William MacAskill, an associate professor in philosophy at the University of Oxford. It advocates for effective altruism and the philosophy of longtermism, which MacAskill defines as "the idea that positively influencing the long-term future is a key moral priority of our time." His argument is based on the premises that future people count, there could be many of them, and we can make their lives better.

== Summary ==
=== Part one: The long view ===
MacAskill makes the case for longtermism—an ethical stance which gives priority to improving the long-term future—and proposes that we can make the future better in two ways: "by averting permanent catastrophes, thereby ensuring civilisation's survival; or by changing civilisation's trajectory to make it better while it lasts ... Broadly, ensuring survival increases the quantity of future life; trajectory changes increase its quality". According to MacAskill, the present era is a critical juncture: "Few people who ever live will have as much power to positively influence the future as we do. Such rapid technological, social, and environmental change means that we have more opportunity to affect when and how the most important of these changes occur".

His argument for longtermism has three premises: first, future people count morally as much as the people alive today; second, the future is immensely big since humanity may survive for a very long time, and there may be many more people alive at any given time; and third, the future could be very good or very bad, and our actions may affect what it will be.

=== Part two: Trajectory changes ===
To improve the future, MacAskill investigates how moral change and value lock-in may constitute long-run trajectory changes for civilisation. He suggests that moral and cultural values are malleable, contingent, and potentially long-lived—if history were to be rerun, the dominant global values may be very different from those in our world; for example, the abolition of slavery may not have been morally or economically inevitable. MacAskill warns of a potential value lock-in—"an event that causes a single value system ... to persist for an extremely long time"—which he believes may result from technological advances, particularly the development of artificial general intelligence.

=== Part three: Safeguarding civilisation ===
Next, MacAskill explores how to protect humanity from risks of extinction, unrecoverable civilisational collapse, and long-run technological stagnation. He argues that the most severe threats of human extinction are posed by engineered pathogens and misaligned artificial general intelligence. He also discusses several potential causes of civilisational collapse—including extreme climate change, fossil fuel depletion, and nuclear winter caused by nuclear war—concluding that civilisation appears very resilient, with recovery after a collapse being likely. MacAskill next turns to risks of long-lasting technological and economic stagnation. While he considers indefinite stagnation unlikely, "it seems entirely plausible that we could stagnate for hundreds or thousands of years". From a longtermist perspective, this matters primarily because long-term stagnation makes extinction or collapse more likely, and because the society emerging after the period of stagnation may be guided by worse values than society today.

=== Part four: Assessing the end of the world ===
The book also discusses how bad the end of humanity would be, which depends on whether the future will be good or bad in expectation and on whether it is morally good for happy people to be born—a key question in population ethics. He concludes optimistically that the future will likely be positive on balance, in part because future people are asymmetrically motivated to bring about good things rather than bad things. He also claims that preventing future people from coming into existence is a moral loss if their lives would be sufficiently good, leading him to conclude that "the early extinction of the human race would be a truly enormous tragedy".

=== Part five: Taking action ===
The book's final part details how to choose which problems to focus on, along with what people can do to take action. In areas such as climate change, fossil fuel depletion, biosecurity, pandemic preparedness, and disaster preparedness, people can take "robustly good actions" like research and advocacy to help. Meanwhile, for issues with more unknowns, such as reducing AGI risk and preventing great-power wars, building up options and learning should be prioritized.

For the individual, MacAskill emphasises the significance of professional work, writing that "by far the most important decision you will make, in terms of your lifetime impact, is your choice of career". He mentions 80,000 Hours, a nonprofit he helped co-found, which conducts research and provides advice on which careers have the largest positive impact, especially from a longtermist perspective. He also argues that donations to effective longtermist causes and organisations are much more impactful than changing our personal consumption.

== Critical reception ==
What We Owe the Future has received coverage in The New Yorker, NPR, The Ezra Klein Show, The Bookseller, and New York Magazine. Adaptations of the book's central thesis have been published by MacAskill in Foreign Affairs, The New York Times, and the BBC.

Publishers Weekly's review described the book positively: "MacAskill delivers a sweeping analysis of contemporary dangers that masterfully probes the intersections of technology, science, and politics, while offering fascinating glimpses into humanity's possible futures. This urgent call to action will inspire and unnerve in equal measure." Kirkus Reviews's review was also favorable: "With something to ponder on every page, a bracing exhortation to do right by the people of centuries to come." Kieran Setiya writes in the Boston Review that it "is an instructive, intelligent book ... But a moral arithmetic is only as good as its axioms. I hope readers approach longtermism with the open-mindedness and moral judgment MacAskill wants us to preserve." Writing for The Guardian, Oliver Burkeman reviewed the book very favorably, calling it "the most inspiring book on 'ethical living' I've ever read."

What We Owe The Future, and the effective altruism movement more broadly, were reported on in a cover story for TIME Magazine by Naina Bajekal, who writes "all the lives still to come ... could be so much better and richer in meaning—or so much worse. If that depends on what we all do in the next few decades, I don't know exactly how to help ensure our actions are for the better. But if the future could be as vast and good as MacAskill thinks, it seems worth trying."

In a critique of the so-called "quasi-religious worldview of longtermism", Salon gave a negative review of the book: "One must wonder, when MacAskill implicitly asks 'What do we owe the future?' whose future he's talking about. The future of indigenous peoples? The future of the world's nearly 2 billion Muslims? The future of the Global South?" Barton Swaim's review for The Wall Street Journal was also negative: "Rarely have I read a book by a reputedly important intellectual more replete with highfalutin truisms, cockamamie analogies and complex discussions leading nowhere. Never mind what we owe the future; what does an author owe his readers? In this case, an apology."

== Publication ==
What We Owe the Future was first published in the United States by Basic Books in August 2022, along with an audiobook version, narrated by William MacAskill and published by Recorded Books. An edition, with the subtitle "A Million-Year View", was published in the United Kingdom by Oneworld Publications in September of the same year.

== See also ==
- Longtermism
- Effective altruism
- Global catastrophic risk
- Suffering risks
- The Precipice: Existential Risk and the Future of Humanity
- 80,000 Hours, a non-profit co-founded by MacAskill that provides advice on high-impact career choice from a longtermist perspective
