= The Most Good You Can Do =

2015 book by Peter Singer

- Author: Peter Singer
- Language: English
- Subject: Normative ethics
- Publisher: Yale University Press
- Publication date: April 7, 2015
- Publication place: United States
- Media type: Print
- Pages: 272
- ISBN: 978-0-300-18027-5

Peter Singer lectures on 'What's the most good you can do?' at Conway Hall in 2015.

The Most Good You Can Do: How Effective Altruism Is Changing Ideas About Living Ethically is a 2015 Yale University Press book by moral philosopher and bioethicist Peter Singer describing and arguing for the ideas of effective altruism. As a follow-up to The Life You Can Save, which makes the moral argument for donating money to improve the lives of people in extreme poverty, the new book focuses on the broader question of how to do the most good.

== Reception ==
=== Interviews ===
Oliver Milman interviewed Peter Singer about the book for The Guardian shortly before the book's release. Hamilton Nolan interviewed Singer for Gawker a week after the release. Singer was also interviewed on ABC Online (an Australian media network) about his book. He also did a longer interview with the Melbourne radio channel of the network.

Singer also participated in an Ask Me Anything on Reddit, fielding questions about his book, on April 14, 2015 (a week after the book's release).

=== Book reviews ===
Nicholas Kristof reviewed the book for The New York Times, beginning with a discussion of the earning to give strategy. Kristof had three reservations about the book: (1) it is not clear where to draw the line with respect to altruism, (2) in addition to humanitarian motives, loyalty is also important and many give to universities or the arts out of loyalty, (3) the idea of taking a job solely because it is well-paying made him flinch. Kristof concluded on a positive note: "Singer's argument is powerful, provocative and, I think, basically right. The world would be a better place if we were as tough-minded in how we donate money as in how we make it."

University of Chicago Law School professor Eric Posner reviewed the book for Slate Magazine, concluding: "So what's an effective altruist to do? The utilitarian imperative to search out and help the people with the highest marginal utility of money around the world is in conflict with our limited knowledge about foreign cultures, which makes it difficult for us to figure out what the worst-off people really need. For this reason, donations to Little League and other local institutions you are familiar with may not be a bad idea. The most good you can do may turn out to be—not much." Posner wrote a follow-up post on his personal blog, stressing that in his view Singer's main weakness was that he did not spend enough time working through the ramifications of the importance of institutions.

Minal Bopaiah wrote a blog post favorably reviewing the book for PSI Impact, a website maintained by Population Services International. PSI was one of many charities discussed by Singer in his book as potentially effective places to donate to.

John Abdulla reviewed the book on Oxfam's blog, concluding: "And so the question that remains for me, as I think more about the ideas laid out in this book, is how can I challenge myself to do more good in this world?"

Glenn C. Altschuler, professor of American Studies at Cornell University, reviewed the book for Philly.com, concluding: "Singer opens up worthwhile conversations (and practical applications) related to ethical ideals. At minimum, The Most Good You Can Do can stimulate donors to insist that charitable organizations provide persuasive proof of their effectiveness."
