= Judith Lichtenberg =

American philosopher (born 1948)

- Born: 1948 (age 77–78)

Education
- Education: CUNY Graduate Center (PhD), University of Wisconsin–Madison (BA, MA)

Philosophical work
- Era: 21st-century philosophy
- Region: Western philosophy
- Institutions: Georgetown University
- Main interests: ethics, political philosophy
- Website: https://www.judith-lichtenberg.com/

Judith Ann Lichtenberg (born 1948) is an American philosopher and Professor Emerita of Philosophy at Georgetown University. She is known for her works on ethics and political philosophy.

== Books ==
- Distant Strangers: Ethics, Psychology, and Global Poverty, Cambridge University Press 2014
- Democracy and the Mass Media: A Collection of Essays (ed.), Cambridge University Press 1990
- Leveling the Playing Field: Justice, Politics, and College Admissions, with Robert K. Fullinwider, Rowman & Littlefield Publishers 2004
