= The Precipice: Existential Risk and the Future of Humanity =

2020 book by Toby Ord

- Hardcover edition
- Author: Toby Ord
- Language: English
- Subject: Existential risk
- Genre: Philosophy, popular science
- Publisher: Bloomsbury Publishing; Hachette Book Group
- Publication date: 5 March 2020 (UK); 24 March 2020 (US)
- Publication place: United Kingdom
- Media type: Print, e-book, audiobook
- Pages: 480
- ISBN: 1526600218
- Website: www.theprecipice.com

The Precipice: Existential Risk and the Future of Humanity is a 2020 non-fiction book by the Australian philosopher Toby Ord, a senior research fellow at the Future of Humanity Institute in Oxford. It argues that humanity faces unprecedented risks over the next few centuries and examines the moral significance of safeguarding humanity's future.

== Summary ==
=== The Precipice ===
Ord argues that humanity is in a uniquely dangerous period in its development, which he calls the Precipice. Beginning with the first atomic bomb test in 1945, the Precipice is characterized by unprecedented destructive capability paired with inadequate wisdom and restraint. Ord predicts that the Precipice is likely to last no more than a few centuries, as humanity will either quickly develop the necessary self-control or succumb to the rapidly accumulating risk of catastrophe. Ord estimates that the Cuban Missile Crisis in 1962, which leaders at the time thought had a 10–50% chance of causing nuclear war, was the closest humanity has yet come to self-destruction in its 200,000-year history.

=== Existential catastrophe and existential risk ===
Ord uses the concepts of existential catastrophe and existential risk, citing their definitions by Nick Bostrom. Existential catastrophe refers to the realized destruction of humanity's long-term potential, whereas existential risk refers to the probability that a given hazard will lead to existential catastrophe. Human extinction is one mechanism of existential catastrophe, but others can be imagined such as permanent totalitarian dystopia. This concept of existential catastrophe is strictly defined as a permanent, irreversible loss of potential; for example, even a disaster that killed a majority of humans would not be an existential catastrophe under this definition, provided that the survivors eventually recover and resume scientific and technological progress. Ord examines the immense moral implications of existential catastrophe from a variety of perspectives: existential catastrophe would simultaneously betray all that past humans have built, bring great harm upon humans existing at the time, and cut off the possibility of a vast future flourishing among the stars.

=== Risk landscape ===
Ord estimates a 1 in 6 total risk of existential catastrophe occurring in the next century. This includes a relatively negligible existential risk from natural catastrophes such as asteroid impacts but is overwhelmingly dominated by anthropogenic (human-caused) existential risk. Ord estimates the existential risk associated with unaligned artificial general intelligence to be 1 in 10 over the next century, higher than all other sources of existential risk combined. Other anthropogenic existential risks include nuclear war, engineered pandemics, and climate change.

=== Response ===
Ord states that humanity spends less than 0.001% of gross world product on targeted existential risk reduction interventions. He argues that motivation to fund such interventions is limited by insufficient global coordination, which could be improved via specialized global institutions. Moreover, interventions such as governance of dangerous emerging technologies may inherently require increased global coordination. Ord outlines a number of policy and research recommendations intended to reduce existential risk. He also explores several ways individuals can contribute to existential risk reduction, such as selecting high-impact careers, effective giving, and contributing to a public conversation on the issue.

== Reception ==
A review in the Evening Standard called The Precipice a "startling and rigorous contribution". In The Spectator, Tom Chivers called The Precipice "a powerful book, written with a philosopher's eye for counterarguments so that he can meet them in advance. And Ord's love for humanity and hope for its future is infectious, as is his horrified wonder at how close we have come to destroying it".

Writing in The Sunday Times, journalist and author Bryan Appleyard expressed skepticism toward some of the moral philosophy in the book, stating "I doubt that it can redirect humanity away from its self-destructive ways", but ultimately praised the book, calling it "dense and often thrillingly written" and highlighting Ord's analysis of the science as "exemplary". Reviewer Steven Carroll in The Sydney Morning Herald called it authoritative and accessible.

A review in The New Yorker published in April 2020 during the coronavirus pandemic noted that the book seemed "made for the present moment" and said "readers may find the sections that argue for why humanity deserves saving, and why we're equipped to face the challenges, even more arresting than the array of potential cataclysms".

== See also ==
- Effective altruism
- Global catastrophic risk
- Great Filter
- Human Compatible
- Superintelligence: Paths, Dangers, Strategies
- What We Owe the Future
