= William MacAskill =

Scottish philosopher and ethicist (born 1987)

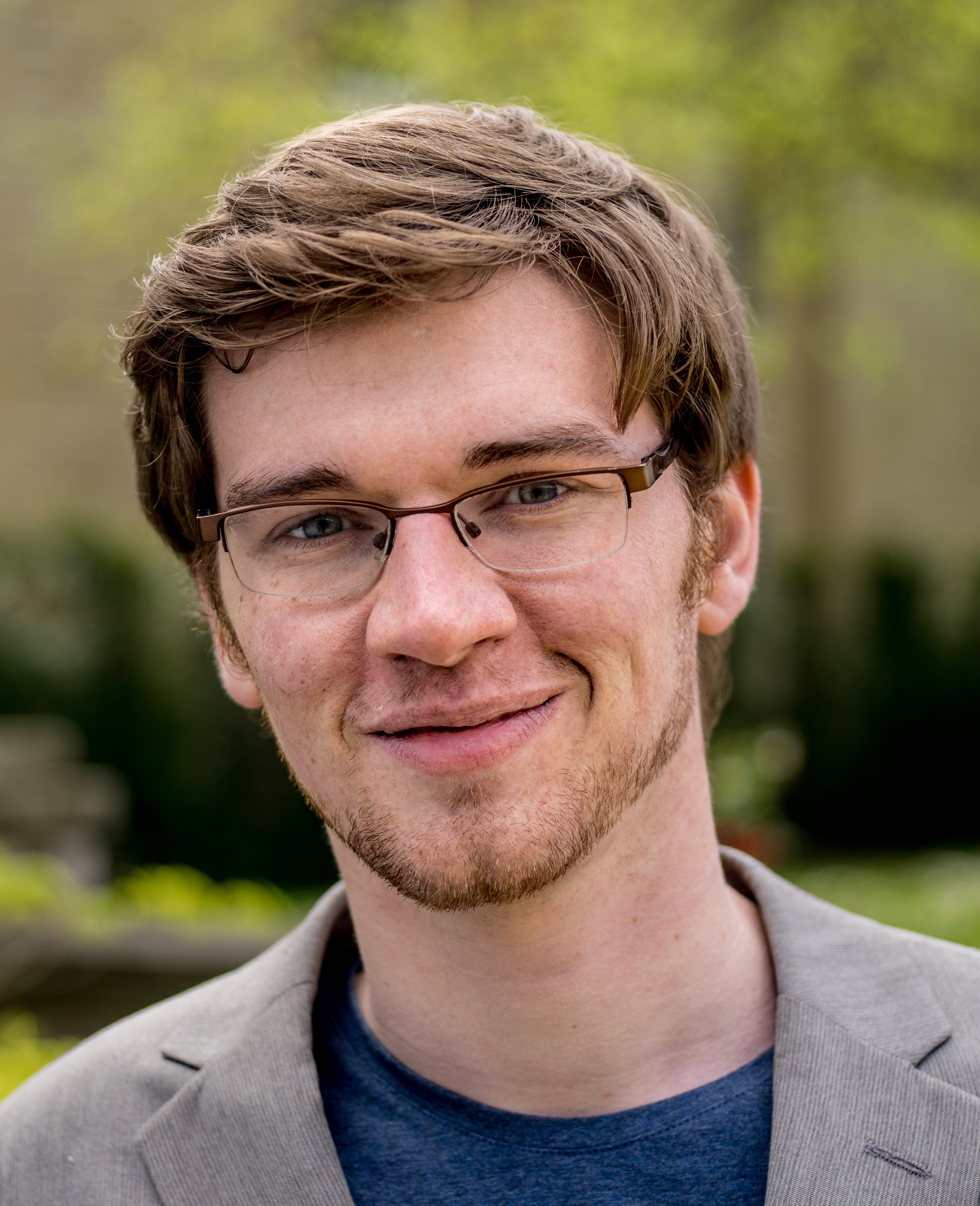
- MacAskill in 2015
- Born: William David Crouch; 24 March 1987 (age 39); Glasgow, Scotland
- Spouse: Amanda Askell (divorced)

Education
- Education: Jesus College, Cambridge (BA, 2008); St Edmund Hall, Oxford (BPhil, 2010); St Anne's College, Oxford (DPhil, 2014)
- Thesis: Normative Uncertainty (2014)
- Doctoral advisors: John Broome; Krister Bykvist

Philosophical work
- Era: Contemporary philosophy
- Region: Western philosophy
- Institutions: Emmanuel College, Cambridge; Lincoln College, Oxford; Global Priorities Institute
- Main interests: Ethics; political philosophy; decision theory
- Notable ideas: Effective altruism; longtermism
- Website: williammacaskill.com

William David MacAskill (né Crouch; born 24 March 1987) is a Scottish philosopher and author, as well as one of the originators of the effective altruism movement. He was a Research Fellow at the Global Priorities Institute at the University of Oxford, co-founded Giving What We Can, the Centre for Effective Altruism and 80,000 Hours, and is the author of Doing Good Better (2015) and What We Owe the Future (2022), and the co-author of Moral Uncertainty (2020).

== Early life and education ==
MacAskill was born William Crouch in 1987 and grew up in Glasgow. He was educated at Hutchesons' Grammar School in Glasgow. At the age of 15, after learning about how many people were dying as a result of AIDS, he made the decision to work towards becoming wealthy and giving away half of his money. At the age of 18, MacAskill read Peter Singer's 1972 essay "Famine, Affluence, and Morality", which motivated his philosophical and charitable interests.

MacAskill earned his BA in philosophy at Jesus College, Cambridge in 2008 and BPhil at St Edmund Hall, Oxford in 2010. He went on to be awarded a DPhil at St Anne's College, Oxford in 2014 (spending a year as a visiting student at Princeton University), supervised by John Broome and Krister Bykvist. He then took up a junior research fellowship at Emmanuel College, Cambridge, before being elected to an associate professorship at the University of Oxford in association with a Fellowship at Lincoln College, Oxford, which he left after one year.

== Career ==
=== Effective altruism ===
In 2009, MacAskill and fellow Oxford graduate student Toby Ord co-founded the organisation Giving What We Can to encourage people to pledge to donate 10% of their income to charities "that you sincerely believe to be among the most effective at improving the lives of others". He co-founded the Centre for Effective Altruism in 2011 as an umbrella organisation of Giving What We Can and 80,000 Hours, which he co-founded with Benjamin Todd, to provide advice on how to use one's career to do the most good in the world. In 2018, MacAskill gave a TED talk on effective altruism at the TED conference in Vancouver.

MacAskill has worked as chair of the advisory board at the Global Priorities Institute at the University of Oxford and Director of the Forethought Foundation for Global Priorities Research.

He was associated with Sam Bankman-Fried for a number of years and reportedly dismissed claims that Bankman-Fried was engaging in inappropriate conduct as a "he said-she said" during an effort in 2018 to oust Bankman-Fried from control of the now-failed trading firm Alameda Research. He was a member of the FTX Future Fund, which granted $160 million to effective altruism causes in 2022, including $33 million to organizations directly connected to MacAskill. Following the bankruptcy of FTX, MacAskill and the rest of the team resigned from the fund.

In 2022, as tech magnate Elon Musk sought funding for his purchase of Twitter, MacAskill liaised between Musk and Bankman-Fried. Musk and MacAskill were previously acquainted; Musk described What We Owe the Future as "a close match for my philosophy". MacAskill contacted Musk to arrange a conversation with Bankman-Fried, describing him as "my collaborator". Ultimately, Bankman-Fried, whose corporate ventures were facing a case, United States v. Bankman-Fried, did not participate in the acquisition.

=== Analytic philosophy ===
One of the main focuses of MacAskill's research has been how one ought to make decisions under normative uncertainty; this was the topic of his DPhil thesis, as well as articles in Ethics, Mind and The Journal of Philosophy.

== Books ==
=== Doing Good Better ===
MacAskill's first book, Doing Good Better, was published in 2015. MacAskill argues that many of the ways people think about doing good achieve very little, but that by applying data and scientific reasoning to doing good, people can have a much larger positive impact. For example, the book proposes that fair trade does very little to help the poorest farmers, that boycotting sweatshops is bad for the global poor, and that people who pursue high-income careers could do more good than charity workers by donating large portions of their wealth to effective charities, i.e. earning to give. However, in the same year the book was published, MacAskill deemphasised earning to give, saying "only a small proportion of people should earn to give long term".

=== What We Owe the Future ===
MacAskill's second book, What We Owe the Future, makes the case for longtermism. His argument has three parts: first, future people count morally as much as the people alive today; second, the future is immense because humanity may survive for a very long time; and third, the future could be very good or very bad, and our actions could make the difference. The book also discusses how bad the end of humanity would be, which depends on whether the future will be good or bad and whether it is morally good for happy people to be born—a key question in population ethics. He concludes that the future will likely be positive on balance if humanity survives.

== Personal life ==
MacAskill (born Crouch) argued that men should consider changing their last names when they get married. He and his now ex-wife, Amanda Askell, changed their last name to "MacAskill", her maternal grandmother's maiden name. MacAskill and his former wife authored articles together on topics of ethical debate before their separation in 2015 and later divorce.

As of 2022, MacAskill lives in Oxford. Out of concern for animal welfare, he is vegetarian.
