= Giving What We Can =

Nonprofit organisation that promotes effective giving

- Abbreviation: GWWC
- Formation: 2009; 17 years ago
- Founders: Toby Ord; Bernadette Young; William MacAskill
- Founded at: Oxford, England
- Type: Charity
- Registration no.: 1207964 (UK)
- Members: 8,983 (2024)
- President: Toby Ord
- Website: Official website

Giving What We Can (GWWC) is an effective altruism nonprofit that promotes effective giving through education, outreach, and advocacy around the 10% Pledge, which encourages members to donate at least 10% of their income to effective charities. It was founded at Oxford University in 2009 by philosophers Toby Ord and William MacAskill.

== History ==
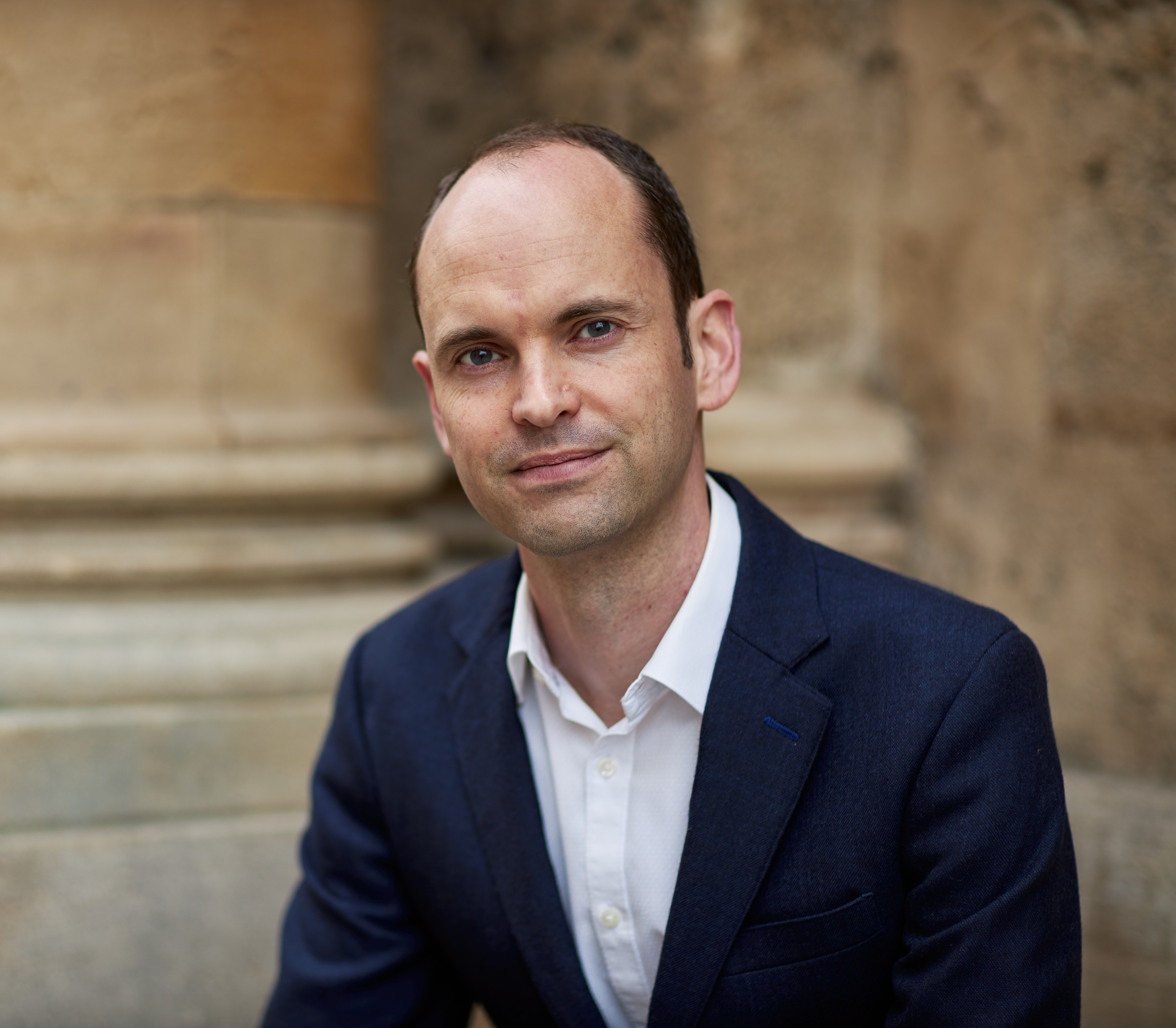
Toby Ord is one of the founders of Giving What We Can.

Giving What We Can was launched as a giving society with 23 members in 2009 by Toby Ord, an ethics researcher at Oxford, his wife Bernadette Young, a physician in training at the time, and fellow ethicist William MacAskill with the goal of encouraging people to give at least 10% of income over the course of their working life to alleviate world poverty. This is similar to Ma'aser kesafim in Jewish tradition and zakat in Islam, but Ord said there was no religious motivation behind it. Ord cited writings from Peter Singer and Thomas Pogge about one's moral duty to give to the poor as inspiration for starting the organisation, and personally planned to give away everything above about $28,000 a year, the median after-tax salary in the U.K. His focus was on donations to charities which saved a maximal amount of life per donation amount.

In 2011, a sister organisation at Oxford led by MacAskill and others called "High Impact Careers", soon after renamed to 80,000 Hours., was spun off from Giving What We Can. In 2012 both organisations incorporated the Centre for Effective Altruism as a nonprofit to serve as an umbrella organisation. In 2024, Giving What We Can became its own legal entity, and is no longer part of the Centre for Effective Altruism or Effective Ventures Foundation.

Giving What We Can began providing regular reports on what charities were most effective at addressing poverty in the developing world, using research conducted by GiveWell along with the concept of the quality-adjusted life-year, as early as 2011. It no longer focuses only on global health, recommending research-backed charities in several cause areas including global poverty alleviation, animal welfare, and the welfare of future generations. (See the section on Research and recommendations for more details.)

== Pledges ==
Giving What We Can promotes giving pledges as a means to help individuals align their actions with their values, take concrete steps to improve the world, and influence societal norms around charitable giving. All members share a commitment to donating at least part of their income and are commonly referred to as "pledgers."

=== The 10% Pledge ===
The 10% pledge is a voluntary and non-legal commitment to donate 10% or more of one's income. This figure is the minimum percentage and was chosen because it has a good balance of significant and achievable. It is a significant proportion of income, in recognition of the importance of the problem and the need for real action. But it is also within the reach of most people in the developed world. Some members decide to go further and commit to donating 20% or even 50%.

In late 2023, the option to pledge wealth in addition to income was added. The optional wealth component of the Pledge allows individuals to commit to giving either 10% of their income or a custom percentage of their wealth annually, whichever is greater. Head of TED Chris Anderson who helped develop the wealth pledge option, was among the first to take it.

=== Other pledges ===
==== The Further Pledge ====
Some members decide to sign the "Further Pledge", where the member defines a basic annual income to live on and donates all income above this level to effective measures.

Founder Toby Ord further pledged to donate anything he earned over £20,000 a year, based on his conviction that he could live comfortably and happily on this income.

Co-founder Will MacAskill is also among those who have made such a pledge.

==== The Trial Pledge ====
GWWC also offers a temporary commitment called "The Trial Pledge" for people that may be interested but not yet ready to take the 10% Pledge. This involves making a commitment to donate at least 1% of one's income for a specified period of time.

==== The Company Pledge ====
In 2020, an option for companies to commit to donating to effective organizations was launched. In this case, companies commit to donate at least 10% of their net profits to effective charities. By 2024, 51 companies had signed up.

== Research and recommendations ==
Giving What We Can conducts research to determine which charities it recommends for members and other people to support. Rather than evaluating individual charities, its research team evaluates the work of impact-focused charity evaluators such as GiveWell, Animal Charity Evaluators and Founders Pledge, and then publishes the recommendations of the evaluators it has judged to be best-suited for helping donors maximise their impact. It provides recommendations in the areas of global health, animal welfare, and reducing global catastrophic risks and allows donors to support those and other programs via its donation platform.

Impact-focused charity evaluators differ from others in terms of the importance given to metrics of charity performance. While evaluators such as Charity Navigator use the fraction of donations spent on program expenses versus administrative overhead as an important indicator, the evaluators that inform Giving What We Can's research use the cost-effectiveness of the charity's work.

This begins with cause prioritization – identifying global problems that are pressing, solvable, and neglected. By focusing on high-impact causes, GWWC aims to direct donations to areas where they can have the most substantial effect. This strategy acknowledges that the variance in cost-effectiveness among charities often stems from the nature of the causes they address.

== Members ==
By 2012, 264 people from 17 countries had taken the 10% Pledge. It surpassed 1,000 members in 2015 and 5,000 members in 2020. As of 2025, it had over 10,000 members.

=== Prominent members ===
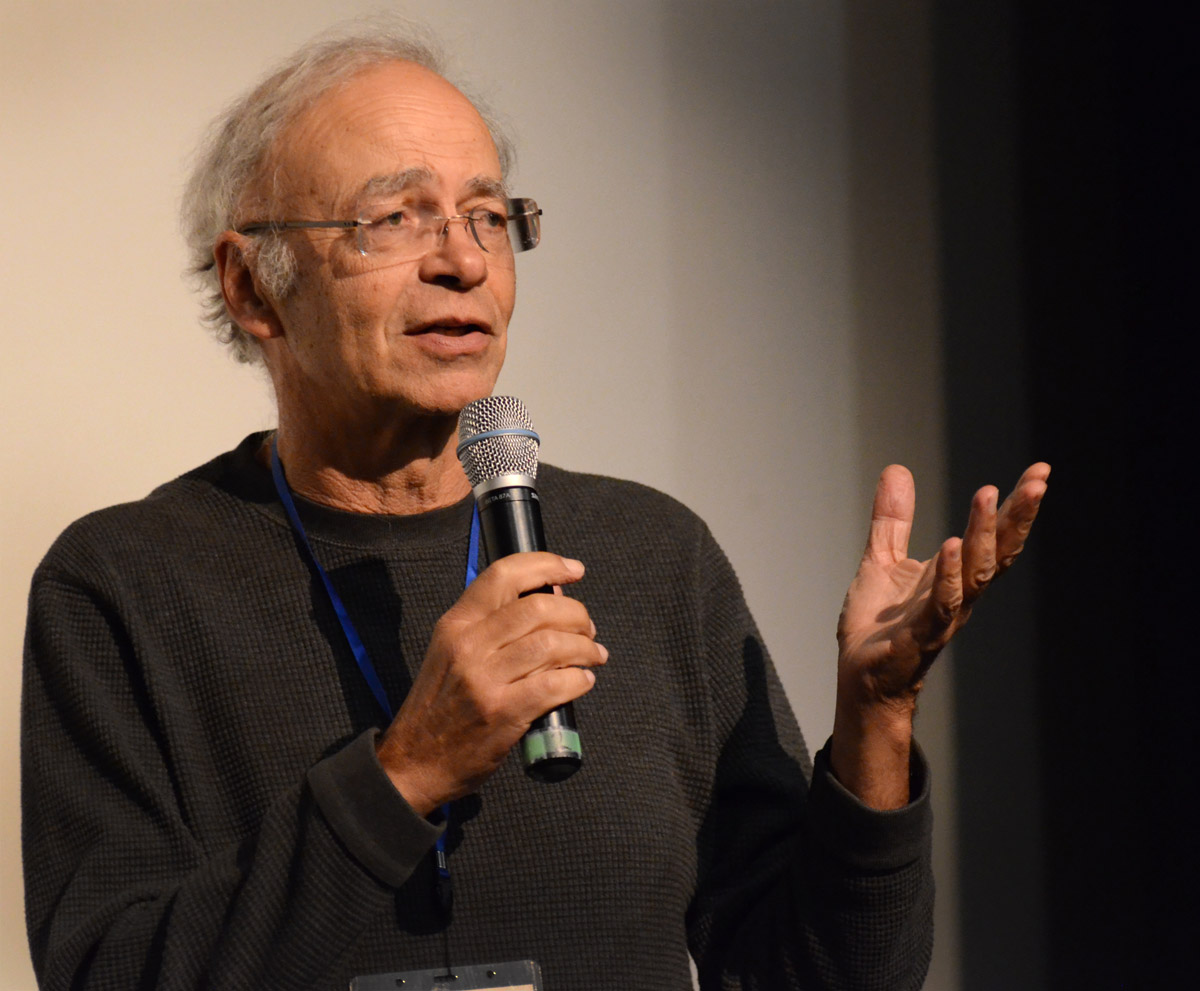
Professor Peter Singer has been a member of Giving What We Can since its foundation.

Since its inception in 2009 the Giving What We Can Pledge was signed by various prominent individuals:

- A. J. Jacobs – American journalist, author, and lecturer best known for writing about his lifestyle experiments
- Adam Swift – professor of political theory at University College London
- Alan Fenwick – professor of tropical parasitology at the Imperial College London, Founder of the Schistosomiasis Control Initiative (SCI)
- Amelia Gray – American writer
- Aviva Baumann – American actress
- Ben Delo – British mathematician, computer programmer, and entrepreneur, co-founder of BitMEX
- Ben Lester – British recording artist and multi-instrumentalist
- Bruce Friedrich – executive director of The Good Food Institute, a non-profit that received donation funding from Y Combinator
- Clare Gallagher – American ultrarunner
- Chris Anderson – Head of TED (conference)
- Dario Amodei – CEO of Anthropic
- Derek Parfit – senior research fellow at the University of Oxford, visiting professor of philosophy at Harvard University, New York University, and Rutgers University
- Derek Thompson – American journalist and staff writer at The Atlantic
- Diana Fleischman – American evolutionary psychologist and senior lecturer at University of Portsmouth
- Dustin Moskovitz – American entrepreneur who co-founded Facebook, Inc. and Asana, Inc., and philanthropist who co-founded Open Philanthropy
- Dylan Matthews – American journalist, correspondent for Vox
- Ellie Chowns – UK Member of Parliament for the Green Party of England and Wales
- Eva Vivalt – Canadian economist, assistant professor of economics at the University of Toronto and the founder of research institute AidGrade
- Janet Radcliffe Richards – professor of practical philosophy at the University of Oxford
- John Bohannon – American science journalist and scientist who is director of science at Primer, an artificial intelligence company
- Jonathan Blow – American video game designer, programmer and Twitch streamer
- José González – Swedish indie folk singer-songwriter and guitarist
- Kelsey Piper – American journalist and staff writer at Vox
- Ken Baumann – American actor, writer, publisher and book designer
- Leah Price – American literary critic
- Liv Boeree – television presenter and former professional poker player
- Marcus Daniell – Olympic tennis player from New Zealand with 5 ATP titles and founder of the organisation High Impact Athletes
- Michael Greger – American physician, author, and professional speaker on public health issues and advocate for plant-based diets
- Michael Kremer – holder of the Nobel Memorial Prize in Economics, professor in economics and public policy at the University of Chicago
- Nir Eyal – professor of bioethics and director of the Center for Population–Level Bioethics at Rutgers University
- Peter Eckersley – Australian computer scientist, computer security researcher and activist
- Peter Singer – professor of bioethics at Princeton University, and laureate professor at the Centre for Applied Philosophy and Public Ethics at the University of Melbourne
- Pilvi Takala – Finnish award-winning performance artist
- Rachel Glennerster – chief economist at the Department for International Development (DFID)
- Romesh Ranganathan – English actor, comedian and presenter
- Rutger Bregman – Dutch popular historian and author of four books on history, philosophy, and economics, including Utopia for Realists
- Sam Harris – American author, philosopher, neuroscientist, podcast host, and prominent atheist
- Thomas Pogge – Leitner Professor of Philosophy and International Affairs at Yale University, director of the Global Justice Program
- Toby Ord – senior research fellow at the University of Oxford's Future of Humanity Institute
- William MacAskill – associate professor in philosophy at the University of Oxford
