= 80,000 Hours =

Career research organisation

80,000 Hours Limited
- Founded: October 2011; 15 years ago
- Founders: William MacAskill; Benjamin Todd
- Type: Nonprofit organisation
- Purpose: Social impact research and advice
- Headquarters: London, England
- Origins: Oxford, England
- Region served: Worldwide
- Product: Free, evidence-based career advice
- Website: 80000hours.org

80,000 Hours Limited is a London-based nonprofit organisation that conducts research on which careers have the largest positive social impact and provides career advice based on that research. The organisation's name refers to the typical amount of time someone spends working over a lifetime.

80,000 Hours advises people to build valuable skills and to apply them to the most pressing global problems. Currently, it believes these are mainly issues that could arise from the development of artificial intelligence.

The book 80,000 Hours by Benjamin Todd features advice based on the philosophy of effective altruism plus personal fulfillment. The organisation has also hosted a podcast since 2017, featuring speakers from a variety of careers and perspectives on such philosophy, as well as a YouTube channel. Articles in the vein of the book and podcast have been posted regularly on the 80,000 Hours website since its founding, which also provides advice through one-on-one sessions.

== Principles ==
According to 80,000 Hours, some careers aimed at doing good are far more effective than others. They evaluate problems people can focus on solving in terms of their "scale", "neglectedness", and "solvability", while career paths are rated on their potential for immediate social impact, on how well they set someone up to have an impact later on, and on personal fit with the reader.

80,000 Hours emphasises that the positive impact of choosing a certain occupation should be measured by the amount of additional good that is created as a result of that choice, not by the amount of good done directly. This approach takes into account the concept of replaceability, acknowledging that if one does not take a particular job, someone else likely will, which could alter the net impact of the career choice. The organization also questioned some popular career advice, such as "follow your passion". They argued that most people's passions tend to be in areas like sports and arts, which offer limited career opportunities, recommending instead to focus on developing skills in meaningful work, as passion typically develops as a result of mastery and purpose rather than being a prerequisite.

80,000 Hours assesses both direct interventions, such as scientific research and policy advocacy, and indirect approaches like earning to give (earning a high salary in a conventional career and donating a large portion of it).

== Focus areas ==
80,000 Hours' primary focus is on advising talented graduates between the ages of 20 and 40.

It advocates longtermism, the view that improving the long-term future is a moral priority, due to the large number of people who will or could exist in the future. Accordingly, the organisation spends significant resources considering interventions perceived to have persisting effects over time, such as improving AI safety or governance, preventing nuclear warfare or pandemics, or enhancing decision-making.

== Funding ==
The largest funder of 80,000 Hours has been Coefficient Giving, backed by husband-and-wife Dustin Moskovitz and Cari Tuna, with cumulative donations of over $20m up to 2025. Other significant individual donors include Ben Delo, Luke Ding, Sam Bankman-Fried, Alex Gordon-Brown, Denise Melchin and Jaan Tallinn. Organisational funders have included the Frederick Mulder Foundation and the Effective Altruism Meta Fund. It received $50,000 from Y Combinator in 2015.

== See also ==
- Applied ethics
- Effective altruism
- GiveWell
