= List of awards and nominations received by Joseph Gordon-Levitt =

Joseph Gordon-Levitt awards and nominations
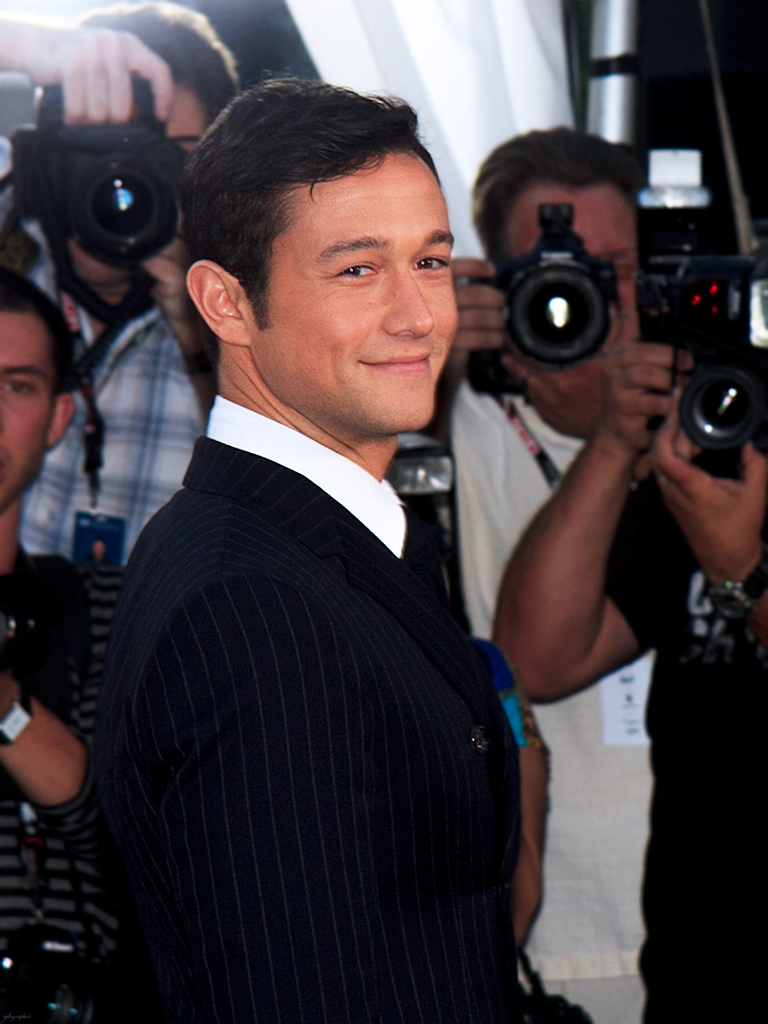
- Gordon-Levitt at the 2012 Toronto International Film Festival
Awards and nominations
Award	Wins	Nominations
Critics' Choice Movie Awards	1	3
Emmy Awards (Daytime)	0	1
Emmy Awards (Primetime)	2	4
Golden Globe Awards	0	2
Independent Spirit Awards	0	2
Satellite Awards	1	2
Saturn Awards	0	3
Screen Actors Guild Awards	1	5
Tony Awards	0	1

Totals (Note: Certain award groups do not simply award one winner. They acknowledge several different recipients, have runners-up, and have third place. Since this is a specific recognition and is different from losing an award, runner-up mentions are considered wins in this award tally. For simplification and to avoid errors, each award in this list has been presumed to have had a prior nomination.)
- Wins: 11
- Nominations: 49

Joseph Gordon-Levitt is an American actor, filmmaker, and entrepreneur who has received various accolades throughout his career.

As a child, Gordon-Levitt appeared in the films A River Runs Through It (1992) and Angels in the Outfield (1994), which earned him a Young Artist Award and a Saturn Award nomination respectively, and in the television series 3rd Rock from the Sun (1996–2001), for which he received three nominations at the Screen Actors Guild Awards.

After a short break, he decided to return to acting with more challenging roles like the coming-to-age drama Mysterious Skin (2004), for which he obtained a Gotham Award nomination for Breakthrough Actor. In 2009, he starred in the romantic comedy (500) Days of Summer, a performance that earned him nominations for the Golden Globe Award for Best Actor – Motion Picture Musical or Comedy and the Independent Spirit Award for Best Male Lead. Two years later, he was nominated for a second Golden Globe Award for the black comedy 50/50. In 2013, he wrote and directed Don Jon, a comedy-drama film that was released to critical acclaim, earning him an Independent Spirit Award nomination for Best First Screenplay. In 2020, he starred in the legal drama The Trial of the Chicago 7, for which he won the Critics' Choice Movie Award for Best Acting Ensemble and the Screen Actors Guild Award for Outstanding Performance by a Cast in a Motion Picture.

Gordon-Levitt is the founder of the online media platform HitRecord, whose projects such as HitRecord on TV (2014–15) and Create Together (2020) won him two Primetime Emmy Awards in the category of Outstanding Interactive Program. He received a Tony Award nomination for Best Special Theatrical Event for producing the Broadway show Slava's Snowshow (2008).

== Awards and nominations ==
Awards and nominations received by Joseph Gordon-Levitt
Award	Year	Work	Category	Result	Ref.
Chicago Film Critics Association Awards	2013	Don Jon	Most Promising Filmmaker	Nominated	
Critics' Choice Movie Awards	2013	Looper	Best Actor in an Action Movie	Nominated	
Critics' Choice Movie Awards	2013	Lincoln	Best Acting Ensemble (shared with the cast)	Nominated	
Critics' Choice Movie Awards	2021	The Trial of the Chicago 7	Best Acting Ensemble (shared with the cast)	Won	
Daytime Emmy Awards	2020	Sesame Street's 50th Anniversary Celebration	Outstanding Host for a Daytime Program	Nominated	
Detroit Film Critics Society Awards	2009	(500) Days of Summer	Best Actor	Nominated	
Golden Globe Awards	2010	(500) Days of Summer	Best Actor in a Motion Picture – Musical or Comedy	Nominated	
Golden Globe Awards	2012	50/50	Best Actor in a Motion Picture – Musical or Comedy	Nominated	
Gotham Awards	2005	Mysterious Skin	Breakthrough Actor	Nominated	
Hollywood Film Awards	2011	50/50	Breakthrough Actor	Won	
Hollywood Music in Media Awards	2023	Flora and Son	Best On-Screen Performance of a Song (shared with Eve Hewson, Orén Kinlan, and Jack Reynor)	Won	
Independent Spirit Awards	2010	(500) Days of Summer	Best Male Lead	Nominated	
Independent Spirit Awards	2014	Don Jon	Best First Screenplay	Nominated	
Jupiter Awards	2014	Don Jon	Best International Actor	Nominated	
MTV Movie & TV Awards	2011	Inception	Biggest Badass Star	Nominated	
MTV Movie & TV Awards	2011	Inception	Best Fight	Nominated	
MTV Movie & TV Awards	2011	Inception	Best Kiss (shared with Elliot Page)	Nominated	
MTV Movie & TV Awards	2012	50/50	Best Male Performance	Nominated	
MTV Movie & TV Awards	2014	Don Jon	Best Kiss (shared with Scarlett Johansson)	Nominated	
People's Choice Awards	2010	—N/a	Favorite Breakout Movie Actor	Nominated	
People's Choice Awards	2011	Inception	Favorite On-Screen Team (shared with Leonardo DiCaprio, Tom Hardy, Elliot Page, and Dileep Rao)	Nominated	
People's Choice Awards	2013	—N/a	Favorite Movie Actor	Nominated	
Primetime Emmy Awards	2014	HitRecord on TV	Outstanding Creative Achievement in Interactive Media – Social TV Experience	Won	
Primetime Emmy Awards	2017	HITRECORD x ACLU: Are You There Democracy? It's Me, the Internet	Outstanding Original Interactive Program	Nominated	
Primetime Emmy Awards	2020	Create Together	Outstanding Innovation in Interactive Media	Won	
Primetime Emmy Awards	2021	Create Together with Joseph Gordon-Levitt	Outstanding Interactive Program	Nominated	
San Diego Film Critics Society Awards	2021	The Trial of the Chicago 7	Best Ensemble (shared with the cast)	Runner-up	
Satellite Awards	2017	Snowden	Best Actor – Motion Picture	Nominated	
Satellite Awards	2021	The Trial of the Chicago 7	Best Cast – Motion Picture (shared with the cast)	Won	
Saturn Awards	1995	Angels in the Outfield	Best Performance by a Younger Actor	Nominated	
Saturn Awards	2013	Looper	Best Actor	Nominated	
Saturn Awards	2013	The Dark Knight Rises	Best Supporting Actor	Nominated	
Scream Awards	2010	Inception	Best Supporting Actor	Nominated	
Screen Actors Guild Awards	1997	3rd Rock from the Sun	Outstanding Performance by an Ensemble in a Comedy Series (shared with the cast)	Nominated	
Screen Actors Guild Awards	1998	3rd Rock from the Sun	Outstanding Performance by an Ensemble in a Comedy Series (shared with the cast)	Nominated	
Screen Actors Guild Awards	1999	3rd Rock from the Sun	Outstanding Performance by an Ensemble in a Comedy Series (shared with the cast)	Nominated	
Screen Actors Guild Awards	2013	Lincoln	Outstanding Performance by a Cast in a Motion Picture (shared with the cast)	Nominated	
Screen Actors Guild Awards	2021	The Trial of the Chicago 7	Outstanding Performance by a Cast in a Motion Picture (shared with the cast)	Won	
Seattle International Film Festival Awards	2005	Mysterious Skin	Best Actor	Won	
St. Louis Gateway Film Critics Association Awards	2010	Inception	Special Merit (Note: tied with James Franco for 127 Hours)	Won	
Teen Choice Awards	2010	(500) Days of Summer	Choice Movie Actor: Romantic Comedy	Nominated	
Teen Choice Awards	2010	G.I. Joe: The Rise of Cobra	Choice Movie: Villain	Nominated	
Teen Choice Awards	2013	The Dark Knight Rises	Choice Movie: Scene Stealer	Nominated	
Tony Awards	2009	Slava's Snowshow	Best Special Theatrical Event (shared with the producers)	Nominated	
Washington D.C. Area Film Critics Association Awards	2010	Inception	Best Ensemble (shared with the cast)	Nominated	
Young Artist Awards	1993	Quantum Leap	Best Young Actor Guest Starring in a Television Series	Nominated	
Young Artist Awards	1993	The Powers That Be	Best Young Actor in a New Television Series	Nominated	
Young Artist Awards	1993	A River Runs Through It	Best Actor Under 10 in a Motion Picture	Won	
Young Artist Awards	1997	3rd Rock from the Sun	Best Performance in a TV Comedy – Supporting Young Actor	Nominated	
