= The Devil's Machine =

2019 British horror film

- Directed by: Lawrie Brewster
- Written by: Sarah Daly
- Starring: Alexandra Hulme; Erich Redman; Jonathan Hansler
- Cinematography: Michael Brewster; Gavin Robertson
- Production companies: Hex Studios; Dark Dunes Productions; Needle's Eye Productions; 7 Toes Productions
- Distributed by: High Fliers Films
- Release date: March 2019 (Glasgow)
- Running time: 94 minutes
- Country: United Kingdom
- Language: English

The Devil's Machine, originally titled Automata, is a 2019 horror film directed by Lawrie Brewster, based on a script written by Sarah Daly. It stars Alexandra Hulme, who frequently stars in Brewster's films. It also marks the third film Brewster and Daly's Hex Studios has created with Dark Dunes Productions.

The film premiered at the 2019 Glasgow Film Festival.

== Synopsis ==
In a remote Scottish mansion, an ancient doll sits, waiting to be evaluated by an antique expert. Despite being aware of the doll's reputation of being cursed, Dr. Brendan Cole is unprepared for when he and his stepdaughter Rose become the focus of the curse of "The Infernal Princess". The film switches between modern day and the 18th century in order to tell the history behind the doll and its curse.

== Cast ==
- Alexandra Hulme as Talia
- Erich Redman as Frederick
- Jonathan Hansler as The General
- Nick Ford as Officer Stille
- Jamie Scott Gordon as Dr. Brendan Cole
- Victoria Lucie as Rose
- Stephen Kerr as Calder

== Production ==
For the film, Brewster and Daly were inspired by a "wild mix of influences" such as Italian Gothic cinema, Mario Bava, Dario Argento, and Roger Corman. It was created over a three-year period and filming took place in Fife, Scotland, and Wales. Filming for The Devil's Machine was completed in April 2018.

Brewster has described the movie as "the most ambitious film we’ve produced". As with previous films, Brewster and Daly chose to use a different style and look than their prior film, The Black Gloves, citing a desire to "take our story to new horizons". To help with production costs, a Kickstarter campaign was launched in the spring of 2018 and by its completion in May 2018, became the site's most funded narrative film in the United Kingdom. Brewster broke a similar record with The Unkindness of Ravens, which was the highest funded British horror film on Kickstarter at the time.

Originally, the film was titled Automata, but the name was changed to The Devil's Machine around June 2019, between the limited release at film festivals and the DVD production.
