= Lord of Tears =

- UK film poster
- Directed by: Lawrie Brewster
- Written by: Sarah Daly
- Starring: David Schofield; Alexandra "Lexy" Hulme; Euan Douglas; Jamie Scott Gordon
- Cinematography: Gavin Robertson
- Edited by: Lawrie Brewster
- Music by: Andy McDonald, Craig Sutherland
- Production companies: Hex Media, Dark Dunes Productions
- Release date: 25 October 2013 (Bram Stoker International Film Festival)
- Running time: 100 minutes
- Country: United Kingdom
- Language: English

Lord of Tears, also known as The Owlman, is a 2013 Scottish low-budget horror film directed by Lawrie Brewster and was his horror film directorial debut. The film first released on 25 October 2013 in Whitby at the Bram Stoker International Film Festival, where it won two awards. The film follows a Scottish schoolteacher who begins to see visions of the Owl Man, a strange figure that he was obsessed with as a child. The film was followed by The Unkindness of Ravens and The Black Gloves, both directed by Lawrie Brewster.

== Plot ==
James Findlay (Euan Douglas) is an average school teacher who has been estranged from his mother for years and has only returned to her home to settle her estate after her death. This somewhat baffles his friend Allen Milton (Jamie Scott Gordon), as his own father is undergoing a serious illness and is unlikely to recover. James discovers via letters that he stands to inherit two houses from her: one small and average, the other a large mansion that he is urged to never again visit. Confused, James ignores her request and moves into the house in hopes of making sense of everything, as he cannot remember his early childhood but does vaguely remember living at the house during this time. Soon after he arrives, he meets a beautiful American, Eve Turner (Lexy Hulme), who lives nearby in a set of renovated stables. He also finds evidence that he had a mental breakdown as a child, brought about by visions of a creature known as the "Owl Man" (David Schofield).

While James stays at the mansion, he begins to fall in love with Eve; he also discovers that the house sits atop a series of catacombs and that his parents dabbled in pagan magic in order to acquire fortune. He eventually begins to recall more from his past even as the Owl Man's presence begins to grow increasingly ominous, culminating in James's discovery that his parents had been worshiping Moloch, who would grant wishes in exchange for a sacrifice. This causes James to regain his lost memories, discovering that Moloch had been manifesting himself as the Owl Man, and that he himself was supposed to be the sacrifice that Moloch demanded. His parents were unwilling to offer James, so they took in an orphaned American girl as a nanny and murdered her in James's stead, claiming that as they had been her guardians, she was a reasonable substitute. James then realizes that this girl was Eve, which has the unfortunate effect of making Eve remember the events as well and turn into a menacing figure intent on driving James insane via a series of attacks. He tries to flee from the house but finds that Moloch will not allow him to leave.

Moloch claims to have no ill will against James; rather his anger is directed at James's now deceased parents. Moloch tells James that only finding Eve's bones and putting them to rest will end the haunting and free him. If he does not, Moloch will haunt him forever. James is able to find Eve's bones and puts them to rest in the front yard. Her soul free, Eve leaves the grounds as a heartbroken James begs her not to go.

James visits his friend Allen and tells his story, horrified that his parents made such a monstrous choice, and states that he would not have done the same. Standing up, James feels woozy. He realizes that Allen has poisoned him and plans to kill him using the ritual sacrifice to appease Moloch. Clearly upset, Allen begs for James to forgive him even as he is killing him, explaining that Moloch came to him and offered to save his father (Neil Cooper) if he completed the sacrifice. The film then cuts to Allen driving his father home from the hospital, with a haunted look on his face. The film ends at the mansion, where a light suddenly turns on in the catacombs. A new skull rests in a ceremonial fashion, hinting that James's ghost has taken the place of Eve's and will remain there until another sacrifice is performed.

== Cast ==
- David Schofield as the Owlman
- Alexandra "Lexy" Hulme as Eve Turner
- Euan Douglas as James Findlay
- Jamie Scott Gordon as Allen Milton (as Jamie Gordon)
- Alan Ireby as Solicitor
- Neil Cooper as Michael Milton
- Nancy Joy Page as Flora May Findlay
- Graham Robertson as Henry Findlay
- Jock Ferguson as Taxi Driver

== Production ==
Brewster came up with the concept for Lord of Tears while researching Pagan folklore of the Scottish Highlands and discovering the Owlman. He also drew inspiration from Japanese horror films, as he saw that these films heavily utilized their native mythology, which prompted Brewster to want to create a film that did the same with Scottish mythology. Filming took place in Scotland in the Scottish Highlands, Dysart, and Kirkcaldy over a two-week period and completed production in fall of 2012. After filming was complete Brewster ran a successful Kickstarter campaign to gain funding to produce marketing materials, finish the movie's soundtrack, and to send the movie out to film festivals.

== Release ==
Lord of Tears had its world premiere on 25 October 2013 in Whitby at the Bram Stoker International Film Festival. It went on to feature at several other film festivals including the Belfast Film Festival and the H.P. Lovecraft Film Festival. The film received a limited DVD and Blu-ray collector's edition release in 2013 through Brewster's Hex Media and was packaged with the film's soundtrack, a printed booklet, and a downloadable electronic booklet. This release received special note for its shipping packaging, as purchasers received the DVD set wrapped in black tissue paper and topped by a single owl feather. The collector's version later sold out, prompting Hex Media to announce that they were going to release a new three disc special edition that would include new content and that the film would have a new edit, updated colour treatment, and sound effects.

On 27 June 2014 Lord of Tears received a video on demand release through Vimeo. The film was retitled The Owlman for its UK DVD release through 88 Films in March 2016.

== Reception ==
Critical reception for Lord of Tears has been mixed. Bloody Disgusting praised the film's acting and later marked it as one of their best films for 2013. Starburst gave the film 8 out of 10 stars, commenting that the film's selling point might lead some into mistakenly believing that the film was a monster movie rather than the ghost story it is, but commented that "Brewster's confident direction allows the film to develop naturally." Ain't It Cool News cited the film's simplicity as a highlight as they felt that Brewster made effective use of the Scottish landscape. Fearnet's Scott Weinberg opined that while the movie did have a few "typical indie-style missteps", they were ultimately minor and that overall he enjoyed the film. HorrorNews.net gave the film a positive review, commending the film's soundtrack, and performances, writing, "Rather than just going the route of horror only, the film tackles things intelligently while also paying slight homage to its roots."

=== Awards ===
- Audience Award at the Bram Stoker International Film Festival (2013, won)
- Best Female Lead at the Bram Stoker International Film Festival (2013, won - Lexy Hulme)
