= Mr. Corman =

American comedy-drama television series

- Promotional poster
- Genre: Comedy drama
- Created by: Joseph Gordon-Levitt
- Starring: Joseph Gordon-Levitt; Arturo Castro
- Composer: Nathan Johnson
- Country of origin: United States
- Original language: English
- No. of seasons: 1
- No. of episodes: 10

Production
- Executive producers: Joseph Gordon-Levitt; Bruce Eric Kaplan; Ravi Nandan
- Producers: Meg Schave; Pamela Harvey-White; Inman Young; Sally Sue Biesel-Lander
- Cinematography: Jaron Presant
- Editor: Sharidan Sotelo
- Camera setup: Single-camera
- Running time: 20-35 minutes
- Production companies: A24; Bek Industries; New Zealand Film Commission; HitRecord Films

Original release
- Network: Apple TV+
- Release: August 6 – October 1, 2021

Mr. Corman is an American comedy-drama television series created by, written by, directed by, and starring Joseph Gordon-Levitt. The series premiered on August 6, 2021, on Apple TV+. In October 2021, the series was canceled after one season.

== Premise ==
Mr. Corman is described as a deep cut into the days and nights of a public school teacher in the San Fernando Valley.

== Cast ==
=== Main ===
- Joseph Gordon-Levitt as Josh Corman, a public school teacher in the San Fernando Valley
- Arturo Castro as Victor, Josh's friend and roommate

=== Guest ===
- Debra Winger as Ruth Corman, Josh's mother
- Shannon Woodward as Elizabeth Corman, Josh's sister
- Logic as Dax, Josh's friend and a social media influencer
- Juno Temple as Megan, Josh's former girlfriend and Dax's childhood friend
- Lucy Lawless as Cheryl, Megan's mother
- Hugo Weaving as Artie, Josh's estranged father
- Amanda Crew as Ms. Perry-Geller, Josh's coworker and an art teacher
- Emily Tremaine as Lindsey
- Jamie Chung as Emily
- Veronica Falcon as Beatriz, a coworker at school

== Episodes ==
No.	Title	Directed by	Written by	Original release date
1	"Good Luck"	Joseph Gordon-Levitt	Joseph Gordon-Levitt	August 6, 2021
2	"Don’t Panic"	Aurora Guerrero	Bruce Eric Kaplan	August 6, 2021
3	"Happy Birthday"	Joseph Gordon-Levitt	Bruce Eric Kaplan	August 13, 2021
4	"Mr. Morales"	Aurora Guerrero	Roja Gashtili and Julia Lerman	August 20, 2021
5	"Action Adventure"	Joseph Gordon-Levitt	Roja Gashtili and Julia Lerman	August 27, 2021
6	"Funeral"	Joseph Gordon-Levitt	Rosa Handelman	September 3, 2021
7	"Many Worlds"	Joseph Gordon-Levitt	Rosa Handelman	September 10, 2021
8	"Hope You Feel Better"	Joseph Gordon-Levitt	Joseph Gordon-Levitt	September 17, 2021
9	"Mr. Corman"	Joseph Gordon-Levitt	Joseph Gordon-Levitt	September 24, 2021
10	"The Big Picture"	Joseph Gordon-Levitt	Joseph Gordon-Levitt & Bruce Eric Kaplan	October 1, 2021

== Production ==
=== Development ===
On September 5, 2019, Deadline Hollywood reported that Joseph Gordon-Levitt would be directing, writing, and executive producing Mr. Corman along with A24. In March 2020, Bruce Eric Kaplan joined as showrunner and executive producer, with Ravi Nandan, Nathan Reinhart, and Inman Young also executive producing under A24. In October 2021, the series was canceled after one season.

=== Casting ===
Variety reported on March 10, 2020, that Arturo Castro will portray the part of Victor. In an interview with music critic and YouTuber Anthony Fantano on September 4, 2020, the Maryland rapper Logic said that he auditioned and got a part in the series.

=== Filming ===
In March 2020, after three weeks of filming in Los Angeles, production was shut down due to the COVID-19 pandemic. While being interviewed by The Talk in October 2020, Gordon-Levitt revealed that production was being moved from Los Angeles to New Zealand to feel safer while filming. In February 2021, Deadline Hollywood reported that the series was in the last few weeks of filming.

== Reception ==
The review aggregator website Rotten Tomatoes reports a 70% approval rating with an average score of 5.80/10 based on 40 critic reviews. The website's critical consensus reads, "A slow build that won't work for everyone, Mr. Corman's dazzling visuals and catchy musical numbers are let down by rote characterizations and a main character who can be hard to root for." Metacritic, which uses a weighted average, assigned a score of 59 out of 100 based on 21 critics, indicating "mixed or average" reviews.
