= The Tiny Book of Tiny Stories =

- Cover of Volume 1
- Author: hitRECord; Joseph Gordon-Levitt
- Country: U.S.
- Language: English
- Genre: Short story, comedy, poetry, adult fiction
- Publisher: HarperCollins
- Published: December 6, 2011 – present
- Media type: Print (hardcover)
- No. of books: 3 The Tiny Book of Tiny Stories: Volume 1 ISBN 978-0-06-212166-0; The Tiny Book of Tiny Stories: Volume 2 ISBN 978-0-06-212163-9; The Tiny Book of Tiny Stories: Volume 3 ISBN 978-0-06-212165-3

The Tiny Book of Tiny Stories is a trilogy collection of poetic tiny, short stories, no more than a few lines long each. It is compiled by owner and founder of the online collaborative production company hitRECord, Joseph Gordon-Levitt and Wirrow, a curator at hitRECord. It is published by HarperCollins' imprint IT Books. The first book of the trilogy was published in 2011, the second and third volumes were released in late 2012 and in 2013. The slogan for the trilogy is: "The universe is not made of atoms; it’s made of tiny stories". It is suggested that the books are for 18+ year olds.

== Publication history ==
- Tiny Book of Tiny Stories 2010 - December 2010
- Tiny Book of Tiny Stories, Volume 1 - December 6, 2011
- Tiny Book of Tiny Stories, Volume 2 - November 13, 2012
- Tiny Book of Tiny Stories, Volume 3 - November 5, 2013

== 2010 Book ==
The first edition was a 64-page book that was self-published by hitRecord in December 2010 containing 31 illustrated stories from 45 writers and artists from 2312 contributions.

== Volume 1 ==
With 88 pages and 45 illustrated stories, the first of the Tiny Stories series used contributions of over 8,600 submissions from 67 writers and artists.

== Volume 2 ==
Published in November 2012, Volume 2 features 62 contributors from some 14,946 contributions to make up 96 pages of haiku-like tales.

== Volume 3 ==
Volume 3 was published on November 5, 2013, with 128 pages featuring 82 contributors from 35,905 contributions.
