= Unkindness of ravens =

Unkindness of ravens can refer to:

- The collective noun for a group of ravens
- An Unkindness of Ravens, 1985 novel by Ruth Rendell
- The Unkindness of Ravens, 2016 British horror film
- The Unkindness of Ravens, 2021 novel by M. E. Hilliard
