= Joseph Gordon-Levitt =

American actor (born 1981)

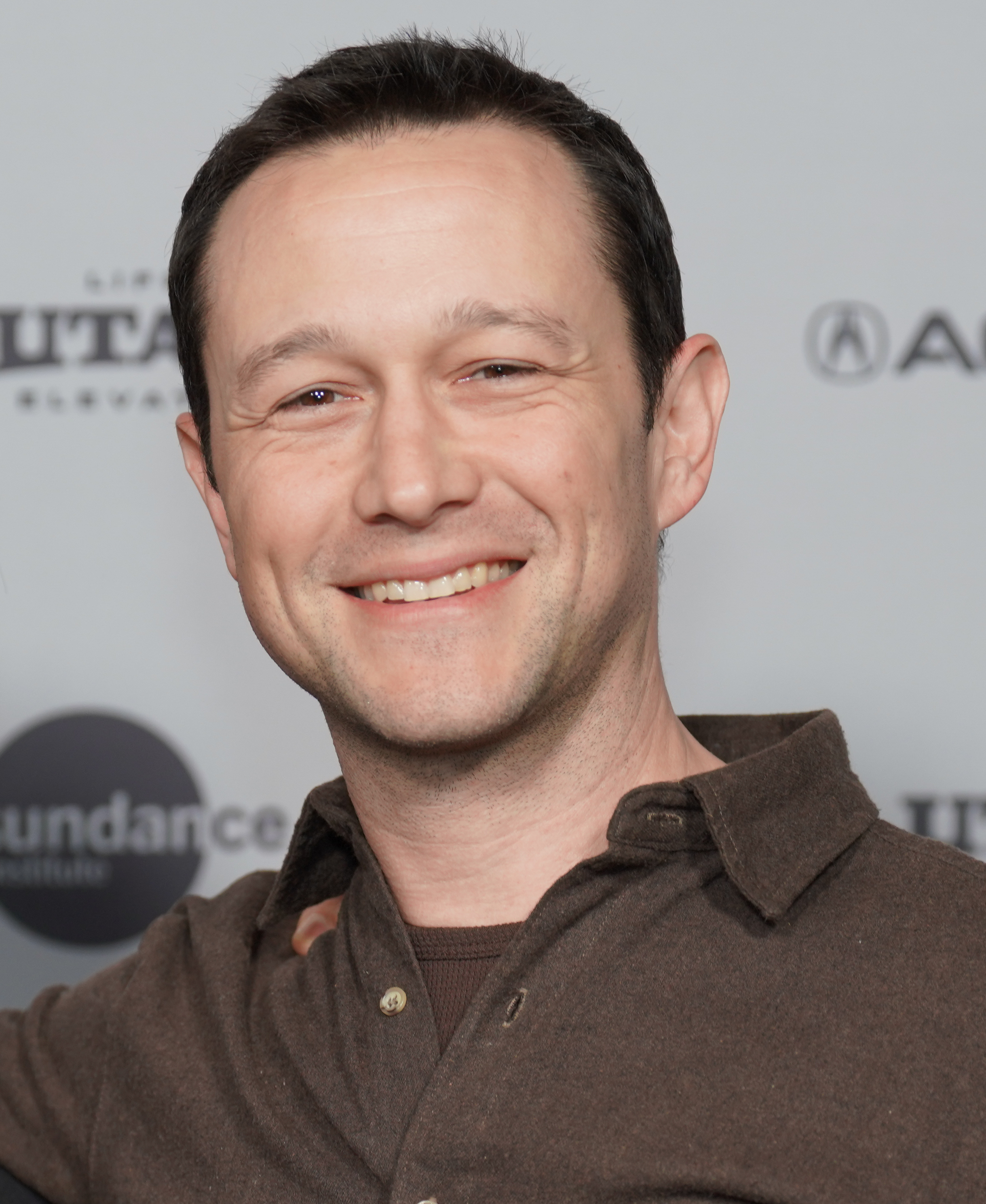
- Gordon-Levitt in 2026
- Born: Joseph Leonard Gordon-Levitt; February 17, 1981 (age 45); Los Angeles, California, U.S.
- Occupations: Actor; filmmaker
- Years active: 1987–present
- Spouse: Tasha McCauley (m. 2014)
- Children: 3
- Relatives: Michael Gordon (grandfather)
- Awards: Full list

Joseph Leonard Gordon-Levitt (/ˈlɛvɪt/; born February 17, 1981) is an American actor and filmmaker. He has received various accolades, including nominations for the Golden Globe Award for Best Actor in a Motion Picture – Musical or Comedy for his leading performances in 500 Days of Summer (2009) and 50/50 (2011). He is the founder of the online media platform HitRecord whose projects such as HitRecord on TV (2014–15) and Create Together (2020) won him two Primetime Emmy Awards in the category of Outstanding Interactive Program.

Born in Los Angeles to a Jewish family, Gordon-Levitt began his acting career as a child, appearing in the films A River Runs Through It (1992), Holy Matrimony (1994), and Angels in the Outfield (1994), which earned him a Young Artist Award and a Saturn Award nomination. He played the role of Tommy Solomon in the TV series 3rd Rock from the Sun (1996–2001). He had a supporting role in 10 Things I Hate About You (1999), starred in Manic (2001), and voiced Jim Hawkins in the Disney animated film Treasure Planet (2002) before taking a break from acting to study at Columbia University, but he dropped out in 2004 to resume his acting career.

Since returning to acting, Gordon-Levitt has starred in Mysterious Skin (2004), Brick (2005), G.I. Joe: The Rise of Cobra (2009), Inception (2010), The Dark Knight Rises (2012), Looper (2012), and Lincoln (2012). He portrayed Philippe Petit in the Robert Zemeckis-directed film The Walk (2015) and whistleblower Edward Snowden in the Oliver Stone film Snowden (2016). In 2020, he had a supporting role in the legal drama The Trial of the Chicago 7. In 2024, he portrayed Detective Bobby Abbott in Beverly Hills Cop: Axel F.

In 2013, he wrote and directed Don Jon, a comedy-drama film that was released to positive reviews and earned him an Independent Spirit Award nomination for Best First Screenplay. He previously directed and edited two short films, both of which were released in 2010: Morgan M. Morgansen's Date with Destiny and Morgan and Destiny's Eleventeenth Date: The Zeppelin Zoo. In 2021, he wrote, directed, and starred in a comedy-drama series Mr. Corman on Apple TV+.

== Early life ==
Joseph Leonard Gordon-Levitt was born on February 17, 1981, in Los Angeles, California, and was raised in the Sherman Oaks neighborhood. He has stated that he is of "100% Ashkenazi Jewish" descent, from a family that is "not strictly religious". His parents were among the founders of the Progressive Jewish Alliance. Gordon-Levitt's father, Dennis Levitt, was once the news director for the Pacifica Radio station KPFK-FM. His mother, Jane Gordon, ran for the United States Congress in California's 28th Congressional District in 1970 for the Peace and Freedom Party and finished last with 2.23% of the vote against Alphonzo Bell, the incumbent congressman; she met Dennis Levitt while she was working as the program guide editor for KPFK-FM. Gordon-Levitt's maternal grandfather, Michael Gordon (1909–1993), was a Hollywood film director. Gordon-Levitt had an older brother, Dan, a photographer and fire spinner who died in 2010 at the age of 36. Gordon-Levitt attended Van Nuys High School and graduated in 1999.

== Career ==
=== Early acting work ===
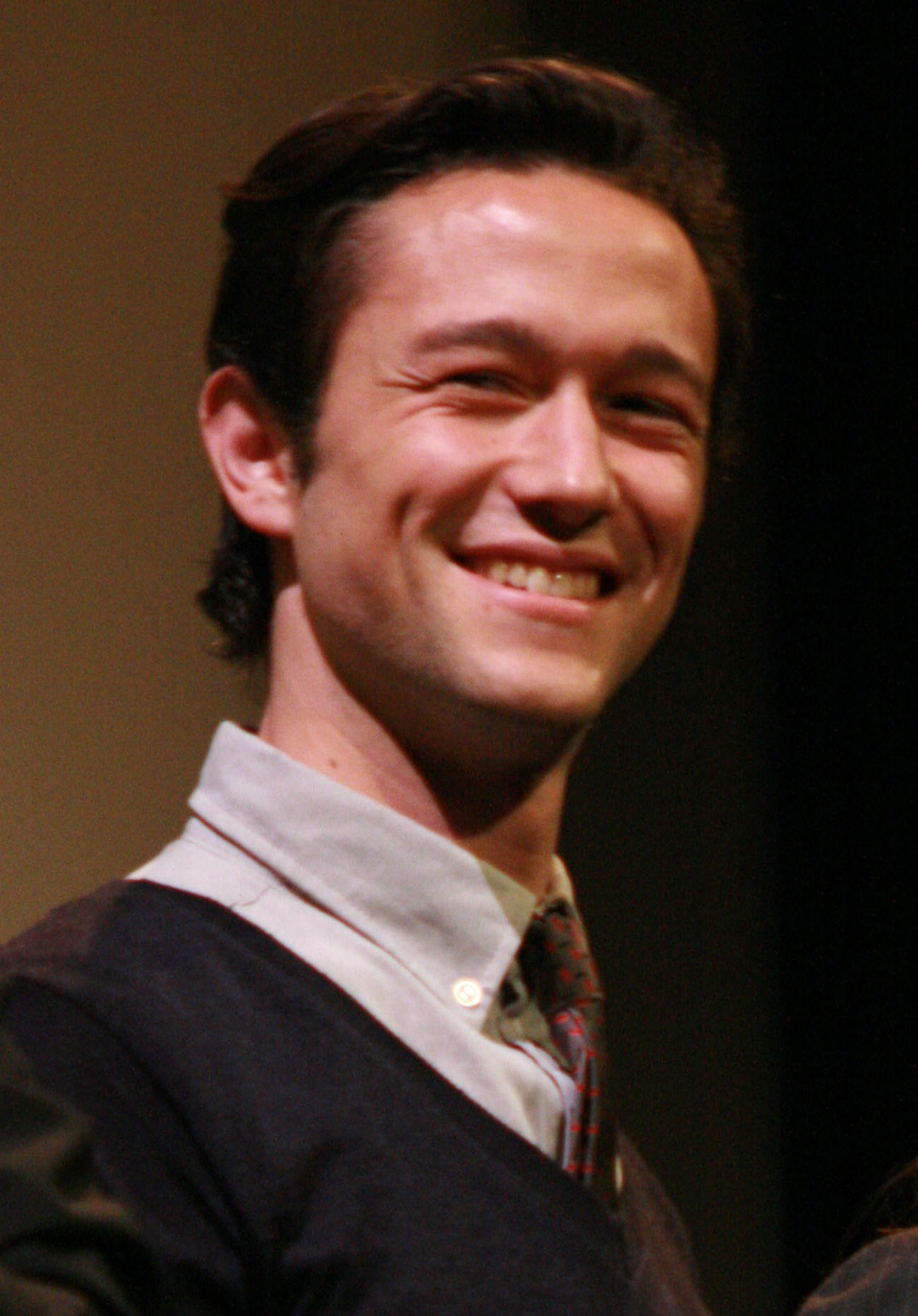
Gordon-Levitt at a promotional event for 500 Days of Summer in 2009

Gordon-Levitt joined a musical theater group at the age of four and played the Scarecrow in a production of The Wizard of Oz. Subsequently, he was approached by an agent and began appearing on television and in commercials for Sunny Jim peanut butter, Cocoa Puffs, Pop-Tarts, and Kinney Shoes.

At age six, he starred in several made-for-television films. In 1991, he played both David Collins and Daniel Collins in the Dark Shadows television series and appeared in the film A River Runs Through It. In the same year, he made an appearance as a boy who witnesses a murder in an episode of Quantum Leap. During 1992–93, he played in The Powers That Be, a sitcom starring John Forsythe, as a clever young boy named Pierce Van Horne. Also in 1992, he portrayed Gregory Kingsley in the made-for-TV film Switching Parents, based on Kingsley's real-life case of "divorcing" his parents. In 1994, he starred in the Disney film Angels in the Outfield as an orphan who sees angels. In 1996, he got the role of Tommy Solomon on the sitcom 3rd Rock from the Sun. The series ran for six seasons. The San Francisco Chronicle noted that Gordon-Levitt was a "Jewish kid playing an extraterrestrial pretending to be a Jewish kid". During the 1990s, he was frequently featured in teenager magazines. He also made an appearance on That '70s Show in 1998 as Buddy, a gay teenager who assumes his friend (main character Eric Forman) is gay, as well, in the episode "Eric's Buddy".

Gordon-Levitt had a supporting role in 1998's Halloween H20: 20 Years Later, the 1999 film 10 Things I Hate About You, a modern-day adaptation of Shakespeare's The Taming of the Shrew, and voiced Jim Hawkins in Treasure Planet (2002), a Disney adaptation of the novel Treasure Island. In 2000, he began attending Columbia University. He studied history, literature, and French poetry. He became an avid francophile and a French speaker. He also dated actress Julia Stiles and the two lived in John Jay Hall. He said that moving to New York City from his hometown forced him to grow as a person. He dropped out in 2004 to concentrate on acting again.

=== Later acting work ===
Gordon-Levitt has said that he made a conscious decision to "be in good movies" after returning to acting. His films include 2001's drama Manic, which was set in a mental institution, Mysterious Skin (2004) in which he played a gay prostitute and child sexual abuse victim, and Brick (2005), a modern-day film noir set at San Clemente High School. In Brick, he had the lead role of Brendan Frye, a teen who becomes involved in an underground drug ring while investigating a murder. Brick received positive reviews, with The Minnesota Daily's critic commenting that Gordon-Levitt played the character "beautifully", saying the performance was "true to (the) film's style", "unfeeling but not disenchanted", and "sexy in the most ambiguous way". Another review describes the performance as "astounding". In 2001, Gordon-Levitt made his debut on the New York stage to excellent reviews in the off-Broadway premiere of Austin Pendleton's Uncle Bob at the SoHo Playhouse. Gordon-Levitt starred opposite George Morfogen in the gritty, two-character play. The production was directed by Courtney Moorehead and produced by Steven Sendor.

He starred opposite Steve Sandvoss as a young, judgmental missionary in Latter Days (2003), a film that centers on a sexually repressed Mormon missionary (Sandvoss), who falls for his gay neighbor. He also had roles in Havoc and Shadowboxer.

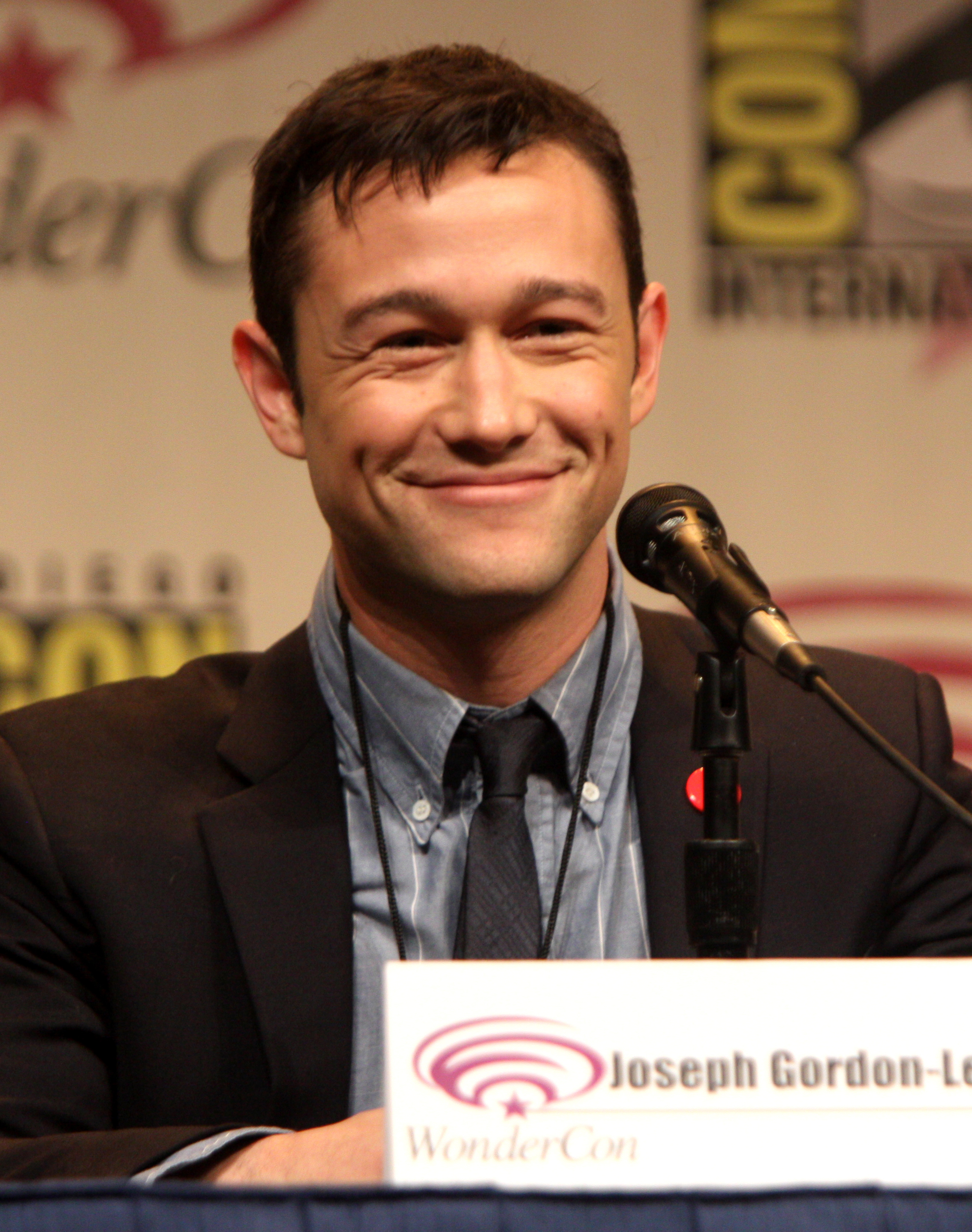
Gordon-Levitt at WonderCon 2012

His next role was in 2007's The Lookout in which he played Chris Pratt, a janitor involved in a bank heist. In reviewing the film, The Philadelphia Inquirer described Gordon-Levitt as a "surprisingly formidable, and formidably surprising, leading man", while New York magazine stated that he is a "major tabula rasa actor ... a minimalist", and his character is effective because he "doesn't seize the space ... by what he takes away from the character". The San Francisco Chronicle specified that he "embodies, more than performs, a character's inner life". His 2008 and 2009 films include Stop-Loss, directed by Kimberly Peirce and revolving around American soldiers returning from the Iraq War, and Killshot, in which he played a hoodlum partnered with a hired killer played by Mickey Rourke.

Gordon-Levitt played a lead role opposite to friend Zooey Deschanel in 500 Days of Summer, a well-received 2009 release about the deconstruction of a relationship. His performance, described as "the real key" to what makes the film work, credits him with using "his usual spell in subtle gradations". Variety's Todd McCarthy praised his performance, saying he "expressively alternates between enthusiasm and forlorn disappointment in the manner Jack Lemmon could". Peter Travers of Rolling Stone said the film "hits you like a blast of pure romantic oxygen" and credited both lead actors for playing "it for real, with a grasp of subtlety and feeling that goes beyond the call of breezy duty". He was subsequently nominated for a Golden Globe Award.

He later played villain Cobra Commander in G.I. Joe: The Rise of Cobra. On November 21, 2009, he hosted Saturday Night Live. In 2010, he replaced James Franco and starred alongside Leonardo DiCaprio in Christopher Nolan's science fiction thriller Inception, which received favorable reviews.

In 2011, Gordon-Levitt began filming Christopher Nolan's The Dark Knight Rises, in which he played John Blake, a police officer who emerges as a key ally of Batman. In Premium Rush, he played the starring role of a fixie-riding, brash bicycle messenger; he portrayed the younger version of Bruce Willis' character, in a shared role for the time-travel thriller Looper; and the supporting role of Robert Todd Lincoln in Steven Spielberg's biopic Lincoln. All three films were released in 2012.

Gordon-Levitt played a new character, Johnny, in the sequel Sin City: A Dame to Kill For (2014), described by the filmmakers as "a cocky gambler who disguises a darker mission to destroy his most foul enemy at his best game". In October 2013, it was reported that he was one of the frontrunners to play Scott Lang / Ant-Man II for Marvel Studios' superhero film Ant-Man, a role which eventually went to Paul Rudd.

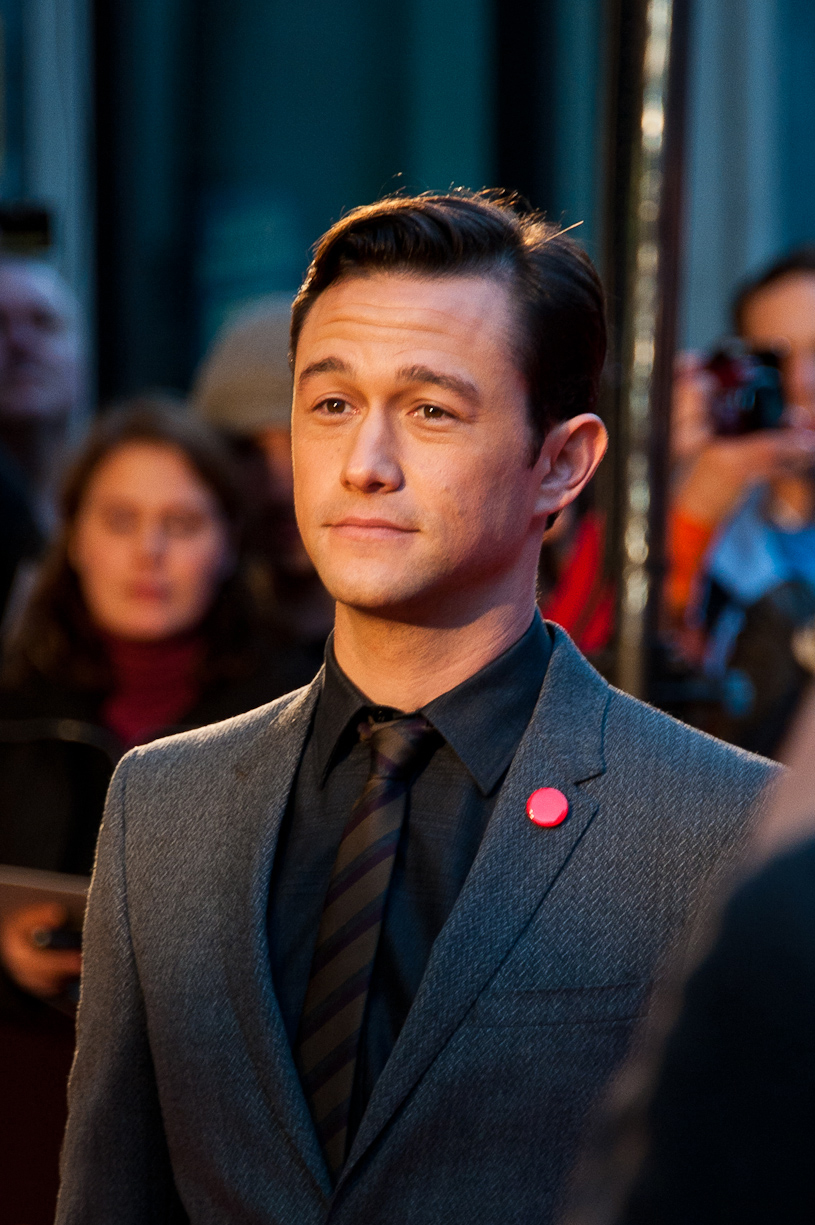
Gordon-Levitt in 2013

In 2015, Gordon-Levitt starred as Philippe Petit in the biographical drama The Walk, directed by Academy Award-winning director Robert Zemeckis. Gordon-Levitt then played National Security Agency surveillance leaker Edward Snowden in Snowden, directed by Oliver Stone. The film was released in North America on September 16, 2016, and also starred Shailene Woodley, Melissa Leo, Zachary Quinto, Tom Wilkinson, and Nicolas Cage.

In 2017, Gordon-Levitt had a voice cameo in Star Wars: The Last Jedi. In 2019, Gordon-Levitt starred in 7500 directed by Patrick Vollrath, which had its world premiere at the Locarno Film Festival on August 9, 2019. It was released on June 19, 2020, by Amazon Studios. That same year, Gordon-Levitt had a voice cameo in Knives Out.

Gordon-Levitt starred in Project Power, directed by Ariel Schulman and Henry Joost, opposite Jamie Foxx and Dominique Fishback; it was released on August 14, 2020, by Netflix. He next played lawyer Richard Schultz in the drama film The Trial of the Chicago 7. The film was written and directed by Aaron Sorkin, and released September 25, 2020. In March 2021, Gordon-Levitt was announced as voicing Jiminy Cricket in Robert Zemeckis' live-action film adaptation of Pinocchio. In 2022, he starred as Travis Kalanick, former CEO of Uber, in Showtime's anthology series Super Pumped, based on the bestselling book Super Pumped: The Battle for Uber by Mike Isaac.

=== Directing and producing ===
Gordon-Levitt's first film as director, the 24-minute-long Sparks, was an adaptation of a short story by Elmore Leonard starring Carla Gugino and Eric Stoltz. Sparks was selected for the 2009 Sundance Film Festival to be shown as part of a new program for short films. In 2010, he directed another short film, Morgan and Destiny's Eleventeenth Date: The Zeppelin Zoo. It premiered at two houses during the South by Southwest festival in Austin.

He was one of the many producers of the Broadway show Slava's Snowshow.

In 2013, Gordon-Levitt wrote, directed, and starred in his screenwriting and directorial debut, Don Jon. The film also stars Scarlett Johansson, Julianne Moore, and Tony Danza, and it premiered at the Sundance Film Festival in January 2013. Following the premiere, the film was acquired by Relativity Media, and Gordon-Levitt stated: "I always intended this to be a movie for a mass popular audience. Everyone told me it was a long shot ... I couldn't possibly be more grateful."

In September 2019, Gordon-Levitt was announced to be writing, directing, starring, and executive producing Mr. Corman, a comedy-drama series produced by A24 for Apple TV+.

==== HitRecord ====
HitRecord (pronounced /ˈhɪt rɪˈkɔːrd/; often stylized as hitREC●rd) is an online collaborative media platform founded and owned by Gordon-Levitt. The company uses a variety of media to produce such projects as short films, books, and DVDs. HitRecord has produced such films as Don Jon and the short films Morgan M. Morgansen's Date with Destiny and its sequel Morgan and Destiny's Eleventeenth Date: The Zeppelin Zoo.

Gordon-Levitt created the platform in 2010 after a period of stagnation in his acting career. "I wanted to be creative, and no one was letting me [so I said] OK, I have to figure out something to do on my own." The company has $6.4 million in venture capital.

On November 6, 2020, Gordon-Levitt released Hong Kong Never Sleeps, a collaborative short film paying homage to Hong Kong created on hitRECord, on his Facebook page. It features photos and videos he collected from Hong Kongers since August 2020, which some themed around the Hong Kong protests starting in 2019, and voice by actors he recruited in October 2020.

== Political views ==
In October 2013, Gordon-Levitt identified himself as a feminist, giving credit to his mother: "My mom brought me up to be a feminist. She was active in the movement in the 1960s and 1970s. The Hollywood movie industry has come a long way since its past. It certainly has a bad history of sexism, but it ain't all the way yet."

Gordon-Levitt has expressed support for the effective altruism movement. In 2017, he spoke at the Effective Altruism Global conference in San Francisco.

Following the October 7 attacks, Gordon-Levitt, (along with Gillian Anderson, Amy Poehler, LL Cool J, Steven Bartlett, Scott Galloway, and tech giants Google, Meta Platforms, and Intel, Amazon, Siemens, and Stripe, Inc.), pulled out of annual technology conference Web Summit following tweets by its CEO Paddy Cosgrave. Cosgrave had tweeted that during its military action in Gaza in the aftermath of October 7, Israel was guilty of committing war crimes.

In June 2026, Gordon-Levitt's name appeared in a leaked document as an attendee of an invite-only annual event organized by Dialog, an organization backed by Peter Thiel. Gordon-Levitt said that he had never met or interacted with Thiel, and that the conference had been ideologically diverse.

=== Tech regulation ===
In September 2025, The New York Times released an opinion video of Gordon-Levitt talking about the dangers Meta's AI chatbot poses for kids. He said that as the father of an 8-year-old, the idea that kids were having "synthetic intimacy" with chatbots talking to minors made him "livid". The actor called Mark Zuckerberg out for choosing "lots and lots of money" over implementing safety regulations for minors' interactions with his company's AI tools.

In December 2025, Gordon-Levitt co-founded the Creators Coalition on AI (CCAI), an advisory council calling for "responsible, human-centered innovation". Other co-founders of CCAI include Natasha Lyonne and Daniel Kwan.

In January 2026, Gordon-Levitt testified at the Utah State Capitol in support of greater regulation of artificial intelligence, telling legislators "there are more laws in place governing how you make and sell a sandwich than there are governing this incredibly powerful, new revolutionary technology that's going to change all of our lives." Gordon-Levitt has also lobbied for the repeal of Section 230.

In August 2026, Time included Gordon-Levitt in the Time 100 list of the most influential people in AI.

== Personal life ==
Gordon-Levitt had an older brother, Daniel Gordon-Levitt. On October 4, 2010, Daniel was found dead in Hollywood, California, at the age of 36. According to the Los Angeles County Coroner's Office, Daniel's cause of death was "ketamine intoxication, with the injury occurring by intake of overdose". Joseph Gordon-Levitt has publicly disputed the claim that his brother's death was caused by a drug overdose.

Gordon-Levitt is married to Tasha McCauley, the founder and CEO of technology company Fellow Robots. McCauley was a member of the board of directors of OpenAI from 2018 until 2023, when she and the board's three other members voted to fire the company's CEO, Sam Altman; she left shortly after Altman returned a few weeks later. As of December 2023, McCauley is an adjunct senior management scientist at RAND Corporation and a board member of Effective Ventures, a federation of effective altruism organizations.

The two were married in a private ceremony at their home in December 2014. Their first child, a son, was born in August 2015. Their second son was born in June 2017. Their third child, a daughter, was born in 2022. Gordon-Levitt and McCauley are known for keeping their personal lives private, and have said they do not want to reveal any details of their children to the media, including their first names. He lives with his family in Pasadena, California.

== Filmography ==
=== Film ===
Key
†	Denotes films that have not yet been released

Year	Title	Role	Notes	Ref.
1992	Beethoven	Student #1		
1992	A River Runs Through It	Young Norman Maclean		
1994	Holy Matrimony	Ezekiel "Zeke" Jacobson		
1994	Roadflower	Richard Lerolland		
1994	Angels in the Outfield	Roger Bowman		
1996	The Juror	Oliver Laird		
1998	Sweet Jane	Tony		
1998	Halloween H20: 20 Years Later	James "Jimmy" Howell		
1999	10 Things I Hate About You	Cameron James		
2000	Picking Up the Pieces	Flaco		
2000	Forever Lulu	Martin Ellsworth		
2001	Manic	Lyle Jensen		
2002	Treasure Planet	Jim Hawkins	Voice role	
2003	Latter Days	Elder Paul Ryder		
2004	Mysterious Skin	Neil McCormick		
2005	Brick	Brendan Frye		
2005	Havoc	Sam		
2005	Shadowboxer	Dr. Don		
2007	The Lookout	Chris Pratt		
2008	Stop-Loss	Tommy Burgess		
2008	Miracle at St. Anna	Tim Boyle		
2008	The Brothers Bloom	Bar Patron	Uncredited cameo	
2009	Killshot	Richie Nix		
2009	Big Breaks	Todd Sterling	Short film	
2009	G.I. Joe: The Rise of Cobra	Rex Lewis / Cobra Commander		
2009	500 Days of Summer	Tom Hansen		
2009	Uncertainty	Bobby Thompson		
2009	Women in Trouble	Bert Rodriguez		
2010	Hesher	Hesher		
2010	Morgan M. Morgansen's Date with Destiny	Morgan M. Morgansen / Narrator	Short film, also director and editor	
2010	Elektra Luxx	Bert Rodriguez		
2010	Morgan and Destiny's Eleventeenth Date	Morgan M. Morgansen / Narrator	Short film, also director and editor	
2010	Inception	Arthur		
2011	50/50	Adam Lerner		
2012	The Dark Knight Rises	Robin "John" Blake		
2012	Premium Rush	Wilee		
2012	Looper	Joe	Also executive producer	
2012	Lincoln	Robert Todd Lincoln		
2013	Don Jon	Jon "Don Jon" Martello Jr.	Also director and writer	
2014	The Wind Rises	Jiro Horikoshi	Voice role, English dub	
2014	Sin City: A Dame to Kill For	Johnny		
2014	The Interview	Himself	Uncredited cameo	
2015	The Walk	Philippe Petit		
2015	The Night Before	Ethan Miller		
2016	Snowden	Edward Snowden		
2017	Star Wars: The Last Jedi	Slowen Lo	Voice cameo	
2018	Endgame	The Guard	Short film	
2019	7500	Tobias Ellis		
2019	Knives Out	Detective Hardrock	Voice cameo	
2020	Project Power	Frank Shaver		
2020	The Trial of the Chicago 7	Richard Schultz		
2022	Pinocchio	Jiminy Cricket	Voice role	
2022	Glass Onion	Hourly Dong	Voice cameo	
2023	Flora and Son	Jeff		
2023	Once Upon a Studio	Jim Hawkins	Voice role, archive audio	
2024	Beverly Hills Cop: Axel F	Detective Bobby Abbott		
2024	Greedy People	Terry Brogan		
2024	Killer Heat	Nick Bali		
2025	Paradise Records	The Negotiator	Cameo	
2025	Wake Up Dead Man	Baseball Announcer	Voice cameo	
2027	Pendulum †	Patrick	Post-production	
TBA	2034 †	—N/a	Post-production, Director, producer, and writer	

=== Television ===
Year	Title	Role	Notes
1988	Stranger on My Land	Rounder	Television film
1988	Family Ties	Dougie	2 episodes
1989	Settle the Score	Justin	Television film
1990	Murder, She Wrote	Boy No. 1	Episode: "Shear Madness"
1991	Changes	Matthew "Matt" Hallam	Television film
1991	Hi Honey – I'm Dead	Josh Stadler	Television film
1991	Plymouth	Simon	Television film
1991	Dark Shadows	Daniel Collins / David Collins	11 episodes
1991	China Beach	9-year-old Archie Winslow	Episode: "Quest"
1991	Quantum Leap	Kyle	Episode: "Permanent Wave"
1991	L.A. Law	Rick Berg	Episode: "Lose the Boss"
1992	The Powers That Be	Pierce Van Horne	13 episodes
1993	Gregory K	Gregory Kingsley	Television film
1993	Dr. Quinn, Medicine Woman	Zack Lawson	Episode: "The Secret"
1993–1995	Roseanne	George	4 episodes
1995	The Great Elephant Escape	Matt Cunningham	Television film
1996–2001	3rd Rock from the Sun	Tommy Solomon	131 episodes
1998	That '70s Show	Buddy Morgan	Episode: "Eric's Buddy"
2000	The Outer Limits	Zach	Episode: "Something About Harry"
2005	Numb3rs	Scott Reynolds	Episode: "Sacrifice"
2009, 2012	Saturday Night Live	Himself / Host	2 episodes
2013	Lady Gaga and the Muppets Holiday Spectacular	Himself	Television special
2014–2015	HitRecord on TV	Himself / Host	Also executive producer
2015	Comedy Bang! Bang!	Himself	Episode: "Joseph Gordon-Levitt Wears a Heart T-Shirt and Blue Jeans"
2015	The Mindy Project	Matt Sherman	Episode: "While I Was Sleeping"
2015	The Muppets	Himself	Episode: "Going, Going, Gonzo"
2015	Lip Sync Battle	Himself	Episode: "Joseph Gordon-Levitt vs. Anthony Mackie"
2015	Todrick	Himself	Episode: "You Unfollowed Me"
2017	Comrade Detective	Iosif Baciu	Voice, 6 episodes
2018	Drop the Mic	Himself	Episode: "Seth Rogen vs. Joseph Gordon-Levitt / Terry Crews vs. Luis Fonsi"
2018	The Comedy Central Roast	Himself / Host	Episode: "Bruce Willis"
2019	Sesame Street's 50th Anniversary Celebration	Himself / Host	Television special
2021	Mr. Corman	Josh Corman	10 episodes, also director, writer, and executive producer
2021	Star Wars: Visions	Jay	Voice, episode: "Tatooine Rhapsody"
2021–2022	Wolfboy and the Everything Factory	Professor Luxcraft	Voice, 10 episodes, also executive producer
2022	Super Pumped	Travis Kalanick	7 episodes
2022	That's My Jam	Himself/Guest	Episode: "Joseph Gordon-Levitt & Chance the Rapper vs. Alessia Cara & Josh Groban"
2023	Poker Face	Trey Mendez	Episode: "Escape from Shit Mountain"
2025	The Simpsons	Monty B	Voice, episode: "The Past and the Furious"

=== Video games ===
Year	Title	Role	Notes
2002	Treasure Planet: Battle at Procyon	Jim Hawkins (voice)	
2009	G.I. Joe: The Rise of Cobra	Cobra Commander (voice)	

== Discography ==
Joseph Gordon-Levitt discography
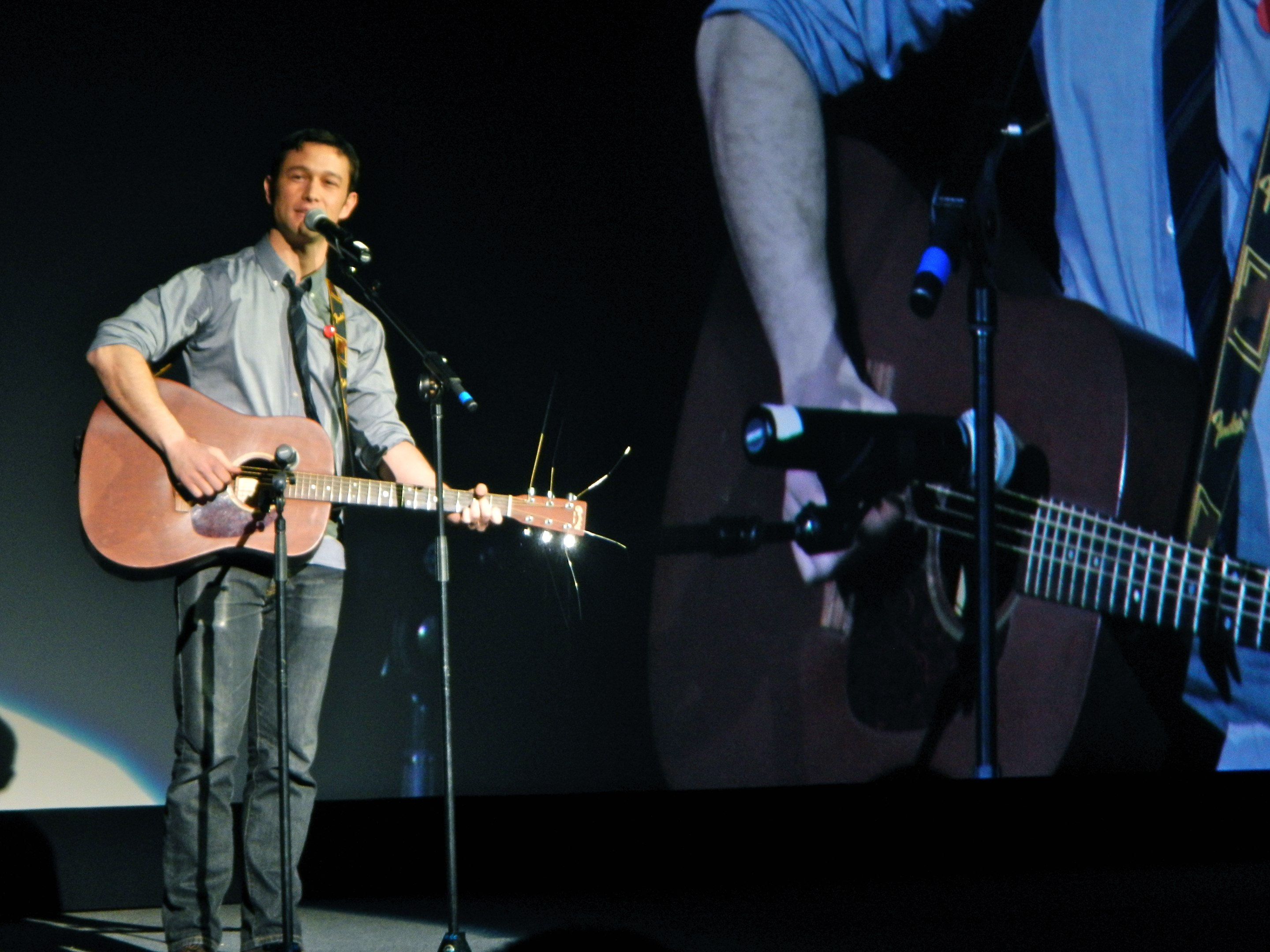
- Gordon-Levitt plays "Hey Jude" at the 2012 Sundance Film Festival
- Soundtrack albums: 1
- Compilation albums: 2
- Singles: 16

=== Albums ===
500 Days of Summer: Music from the Original Motion Picture	Released: July 9 or 16, 2009; Label: Sire Records; Format: iTunes Bonus Track
hitRECord : RECollection, Vol. 1	Released: September 20, 2011; Label: HitRecord; Format: iTunes
Move On the Sun	Released: September 11, 2012; Label: HitRecord; Format: iTunes

== Awards and nominations ==
Preceded by Chris O'Donnell	Actors to portray Robin; 2012	Succeeded by none
