= Briony Monroe =

Scottish actress

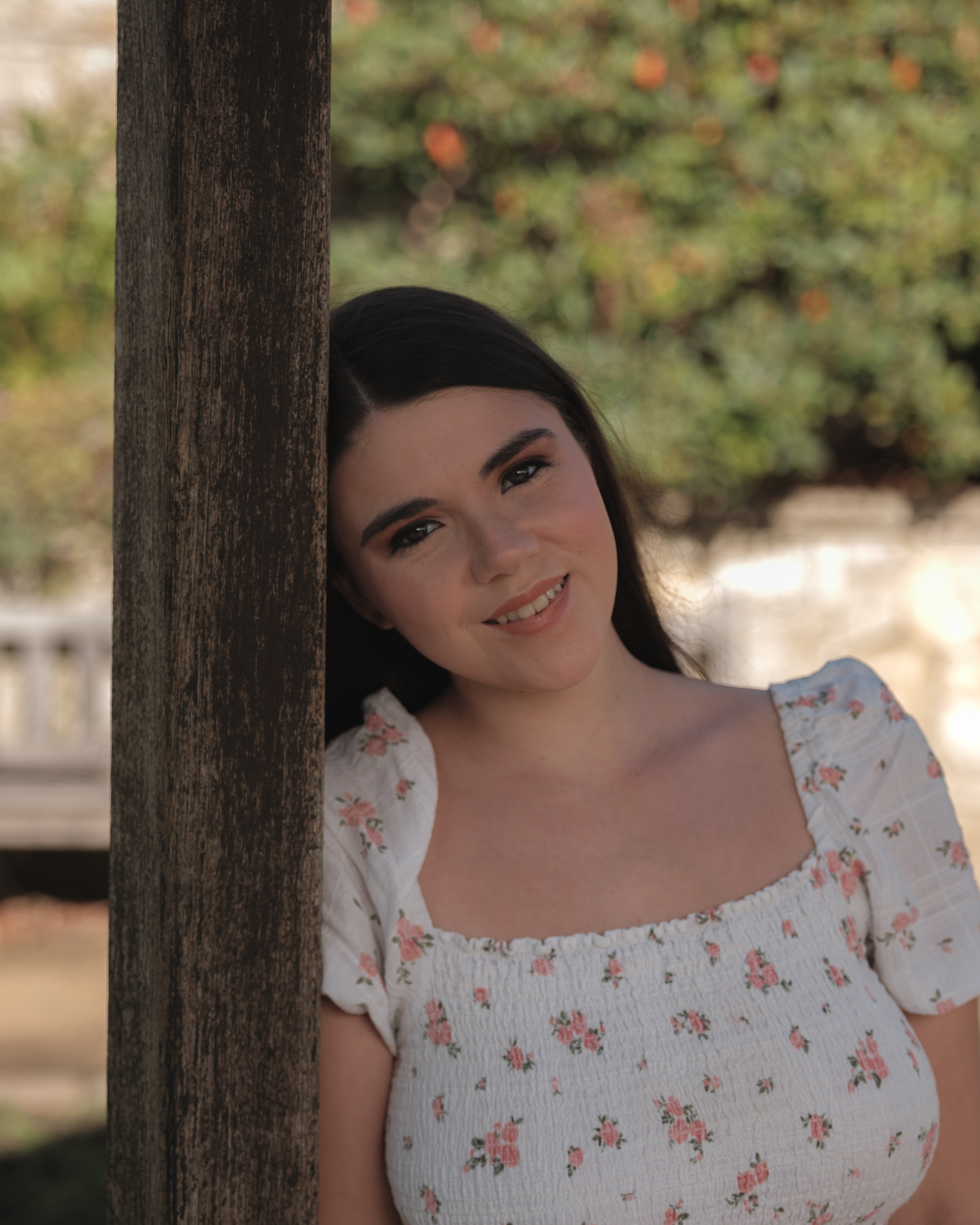
- Monroe in 2023
- Born: Glasgow, Scotland
- Occupation: Actress
- Years active: 2016–present

Briony Monroe is a Scottish actress. She is known for her many roles in fantasy and horror films, playing the mysterious Faith Fairbairn in Matriarch (2018), and Susan Barrow in the 2017 horror film, The Black Gloves (2017). She studied and trained at the iNTER Performing Arts Academy (formerly the UK Theatre School Performing Arts Academy) in Glasgow, achieving her LAMDA qualification in 2015.

In 2017, she was awarded Best (Lead) Actress for her portrayal of Sarah in Eggshells (2016), both by The Scottish Short Film Festival and the Barcelona Planet Film Festival In 2021, she was awarded Best Actor - Short Film at the Columbia Film Festival for her portrayal of Jessica in Killing Me Softly with Her Love (2020), in which she starred alongside Kate Dickie.

== Early life ==
Monroe was born in Glasgow, Scotland, but spent a large proportion of her childhood in The Hague, the Netherlands, due to a move by her family. Here, she attended the British School in the Netherlands.

At the age of 11, Monroe and her family returned to Newton Mearns, Scotland, where she attended Mearns Castle High School. After leaving school, she studied at the UK Theatre School, obtaining her LAMDA qualifications in 2015. Additionally, Monroe graduated from Glasgow Kelvin College with an Higher National Diploma in Acting & Performance.

== Artificial intelligence controversy ==
In late 2025, Monroe became a central figure in a public debate regarding artificial intelligence and performer rights after the launch of Tilly Norwood, an AI-generated character created by the production company Particle 6.

Monroe alleged that the digital avatar bore a "striking resemblance" to her own likeness, specifically citing a medieval-themed promotional image and certain performance mannerisms in Norwood's showreel. Monroe stated that she was "terrified" by the lack of transparency in the creation process and expressed concern that her image and rights had been breached without consent.

Particle 6 denied the allegations, maintaining that Tilly Norwood was developed "entirely from scratch" and that Monroe's personal data or likeness were not used. Monroe is currently supported by the trade union Equity, which has used her case to highlight gaps in current copyright frameworks regarding AI-generated personae.

== Personal life ==
Monroe was diagnosed with Asperger syndrome at the age of 19. Since then, Monroe has sought to campaign for more public awareness of the syndrome. In 2021, Monroe was interviewed by Scottish indie filmmaker, director and producer, Lawrie Brewster, and openly discussed the challenges of the autism spectrum disorder (ASD). Also in 2021, Monroe was a special guest at a drama workshop provided by Perth Autism Support.

Monroe supported Rebecca Rocks in 2018 by partaking in a sponsored fire walk. In 2020, following the admission of two family members, she supported the Beatson Oncology Unit in Glasgow, by taking part in a sponsored hike.

== Filmography ==
=== Film ===
| Year | Title | Role | Notes |
|---|---|---|---|
| 2016 | Eggshells | Sarah | Short film |
| 2017 | Deep Shit | Laura | |
| 2017 | Empty Spaces | Holly | Short film |
| 2017 | The Black Gloves | Susan Barrow | |
| 2018 | Wild is the North | Isla | Short film |
| 2018 | In The Dark of Day | Cassie | Short film |
| 2018 | Matriarch | Faith Fairbairn / Ellie Adams | |
| 2019 | Sheltered | Sally Fox | Short film |
| 2019 | Bully | Jane | Short film |
| 2020 | Killing Me Softly With Her Love | Jessica | Short film |
| 2021 | Clown in the Moon | Emily | Short film |
| 2021 | Dragon Knight | Lauris | |
| 2021 | Realm of Darkness | Teri Fox | |
| 2021 | Kayla | Gina | Short film |
| 2021 | Wild is the North | Isla | Short film |
| 2024 | The Slave and the Sorcerer | Princess Meyra | |
| 2024 | The Defender | Hannah | |
| 2026 | The Slave and the General | Princess Meyra | |

=== Television ===
| Year | Title | Role | Notes |
|---|---|---|---|
| 2020 | Entente Cordiale? | Cheryl Boon | TV Special |

== Awards and nominations ==
| Year | Nominated work | Award | Category | Result |
|---|---|---|---|---|
| 2017 | Eggshells | Barcelona Planet Film Festival | Best Actress | Won |
| 2017 | Eggshells | The Scottish Short Film Festival | Best Actress | Won |
| 2019 | Sheltered | Queen Palm International Film Festival | Best Actress - Short Film | Won |
| 2019 | Sheltered | Queen Palm International Film Festival | Best Actress | Won |
| 2021 | Killing Me Softly with Her Love | Columbia Film Festival | Best Actor - Short Film | Won |
