= Alexandra Nicole Hulme =

American actress

Alexandra Nicole Hulme is an actress known for her work with Lawrie Brewster.

== Select filmography ==
=== Film ===
- (500) Days of Summer (2009, dancer)
- Post (2011, Lolita)
- A Glimpse Inside the Mind of Charles Swan III (2012, Yvonne)
- Raptor Ranch (2012, Kolin)
- Lord of Tears (2013, Eve Turner)
- Kids vs Monsters (2015, Rebecca)
- The Black Gloves (2017, Elisa Grey)
- The Devil's Machine (2019)

=== Short films ===
- The Waterson Project (2006, Sexy distraction)
- A Portrait of Love (2007)
- Morgan M. Morgansen's Date with Destiny (2010, Destiny)
- Morgan and Destiny's Eleventeenth Date: The Zeppelin Zoo (2010, Destiny)
- Gray Dog (2013, Gray Dog)
- The Nutcracked (2015, Clara)
- The Romantics (2015, Vanessa)
- Azure (2016, Helena von Thurnau)

=== Television ===
- A House Divided (2006, TV movie, Lt. Walnut)
- Girls (2017, 1 episode, as Crystal)
