= Brian Graden =

American television executive (born 1963)

- Born: March 23, 1963 (age 63)
- Education: Oral Roberts University (BA); Harvard University (MBA)
- Occupation: Media executive

Brian Graden (born March 23, 1963) is an American television executive and founder and CEO of Emmy-winning Brian Graden Media, founded in 2013. Its series include Create Together (Emmy winner), Escape the Night, HitRECord on TV (Emmy winner), Finding Prince Charming, Lance Loves Michael: The Lance Bass Wedding Special, Walk of Shame, Gay Skit Happens, and The Disappearance of Natalee Holloway.

Graden was previously a senior vice president at Fox Lab, Fox’s alternative programming unit. While there he oversaw shows like COPS and America’s Most Wanted. He also created the relationship show, STUDS. In 1997, he became MTV’s executive VP of programming, and was put in charge of all programming. This was a change for MTV, as the network previously had four programming executives. In 2002, he was promoted to president of programming for MTV and MTV2. Later that year, after being asked to assess a struggling VH1, he was named President of Entertainment, MTV and VH1. He was responsible for the programming strategy and development slate for VH1, and the creative and business developments of MTV, MTV2, CMT, and eventually Logo, which was launched in 2005 as the first 24 hour gay and lesbian network with Graden as president.

As President of Entertainment, Graden oversaw and/or greenlit shows like Total Request Live, The Osbournes, Jackass, Jersey Shore, and Teen Moms for MTV; Best Week Ever and I Love the 80s for VH1; and RuPaul’s Drag Race for Logo.

Prior to his work with MTV, Graden worked with Trey Parker and Matt Stone as an executive producer of the hit animated series South Park.

== Early life and education ==
Graden grew up in Hillsboro, Illinois, and graduated from Hillsboro High School in 1981. He graduated from Oral Roberts University in 1985 with a degree in business, and later graduated with an MBA from Harvard University.

== Career ==
=== Fox Network ===
Graden began working in television, ultimately becoming a senior vice president at Foxlab, Fox's alternative-programming unit, where he oversaw shows like COPS and America's Most Wanted.

=== South Park/Comedy Central ===
In 1995, he hired Trey Parker and Matt Stone to create a video Christmas card after seeing their animated short The Spirit of Christmas. This led to the hit video “Jesus vs. Santa.” Parker and Stone decided to further develop their characters and pitch a show to Fox. When the network decided not to pursue Stone’s and Parker’s animated series South Park, Graden left Fox and became an executive producer for the series. It was picked up by Comedy Central.

=== MTV Networks ===
In November 1997, Graden joined MTV as executive vice president of programming. Under the role, Graden was responsible for all of MTV’s programming. This was a new structure for the network as it had previously had four programming executives.

In 2001, MTV partnered with groups including the Gay, Lesbian & Straight Education Network (GLSEN) to run a campaign that examined hate crimes. The campaign included using 17 hours of air time to run a scroll listing the names of hundreds of victims of hate crimes.

In 2002, Graden was promoted to president of programming for MTV and MTV2. He was responsible for creative content on all platforms, and oversaw music, news and specials, production, talent and artist relations, animation, scheduling, and series development.

In the spring of 2002 he was asked to assess VH1, which was struggling. After his review, he was put in charge of restructuring the network and was named President Entertainment, MTV and VH1. This made him additionally responsible for developing the programming strategy and development slate for VH1, as well as the creative and business developments of MTV, MTV2, CMT, and Logo.

In 2005, Graden helped oversee the launch of Logo, the first 24-hour, completely ad-supported gay and lesbian cable network. Graden was also president of Logo.

In the April 2007 issue of Out, Graden was ranked the number ten most powerful gay person in America. He has also been named one of the most influential executives in reality programming.

=== Brian Graden Media ===
In 2009, Graden announced he was stepping down as the president of entertainment at MTV Networks in order to focus on writing a musical, Limbo, and two books. In 2013, he founded Brian Graden Media (BGM) and is CEO. The company’s original works have aired on Oxygen, Logo, YouTube, Netflix, and other networks. This includes Finding Prince Charming (Logo), Lance Loves Michael: The Lance Bass Wedding Special (E!), Walk of Shame (VH1), The Disappearance of Natalee Holloway (Oxygen), and Gay Skit Happens (Logo).

BGM’s show HitRECord on TV, which was created, hosted, and directed by Joseph Gordon Levitt, has been nominated for Emmys twice, and won an Emmy in 2014, and the program Create Together won an Emmy in 2020.

In November 2021, BGM signed TikTok stars Robert Reeves, Mick Peterson, Bill Lyons, and Jessay Martin, to develop a docuseries about their lives. The four are known as the “Old Gays.”

In June 2022, Netflix greenlit Stand Out: The Documentary, which examines the history of LGBTQ stand-up comedy. It will combine original performances, interviews, archival materials, and backstage vérité footage while exploring themes such as “comedy as activism, diversity in stand-up, new queer culture, and mainstreaming the alternative.” The executive producers are Graden, Dave Mace, and LB Horschler from BGM, and Wanda Sykes from Push It Productions.

== Series ==
Graden assisted in the development of and/or at one time oversaw:

Fox:

- America's Most Wanted
- COPS

Comedy Central:

- South Park

MTV:

- Boiling Points
- Celebrity Death Match
- Cribs
- High School Stories
- Jackass
- Jersey Shore
- Laguna Beach
- Next
- Pimp My Ride
- Punk’d
- Room Raiders
- Teen Mom
- The Hills
- The Newlyweds
- The Osbournes
- Total Request Live (TRL)

VH1:

- Best Week Ever
- I Love the 80s

Logo:

- RuPaul’s Drag Race (moved to VH1 in 2017)

Brian Graden Media:

- Create Together - Emmy winner
- Escape the Night
- Finding Prince Charming
- Gay Skit Happens
- HitRECord on TV - Emmy winner
- Lance Loves Michael: The Lance Bass Wedding Special
- Walk of Shame
- The Disappearance of Natalee Holloway

== Awards ==
Graden received:

- The EQCA Equality Leadership Award in 2005
- The GLAAD Media Vito Russo Award for Excellence in Media
- The EQCA Award for Commitment to Advancing LGBT Equality
- The Equality Forum’s National Role Model award for his commitment to civil rights for the LGBT community

Brian Graden Media received:

- 2014 Emmy Award for Outstanding Creative Achievement in Interactive Media - Social TV Experience - HitRECord on TV
- 2020 Creative Arts Emmy Award - Outstanding Innovation in Interactive Programming - Create Together

Graden and Logo TV received the 2018 Media Award.
