= The Black Gloves =

2017 British film by Lawrie Brewster

- Directed by: Lawrie Brewster
- Written by: Sarah Daly
- Produced by: Sarah Daly
- Starring: Macarena Gómez; Alexandra Nicole Hulme; Nicholas Vince; Jamie Scott Gordon; Briony Monroe
- Cinematography: Michael Brewster; Gavin Robertson
- Edited by: Lawrie Brewster; Sarah Daly
- Music by: Joni Fuller
- Production company: Hex Media
- Distributed by: Hex Media
- Release date: 27 October 2017 (Morbido Film Festival)
- Running time: 80 minutes
- Country: United Kingdom
- Language: English

The Black Gloves is a 2017 horror film directed by Lawrie Brewster and starring Macarena Gómez. It serves as a prequel to his 2013 debut horror film Lord of Tears. The film is set during the 1940s, and tells the story of a psychologist who soon finds himself at odds with the Owlman, a sinister owl-headed figure.

== Plot ==
Finn Galloway is a psychologist who has become obsessed with one of his patients, a young woman who had been terrified of a sinister owl-headed entity called the Owlman. His investigations bear little fruit until he learns of a former ballerina named Elisa Grey, who has sequestered herself at the Baldurrock Estate with only her guardian Lorena Velasco for company.

Finn discovers that Elisa suffers from identical fears, which prompts him to begin treating her in hopes of uncovering the truth – only to find that this will likely bring him face to face with the terrifying Owlman.

== Cast ==
- Macarena Gómez ... Lorena Velasco
- Alexandra Nicole Hulme ... Elisa Grey
- Nicholas Vince ... Uncle Edward
- Jamie Scott Gordon ... Finn Galloway
- Briony Monroe ... Susan Barrow
- Iain Mitchell Leslie ... Ian Leslie
- Hana Mackenzie ... Galina Osipova
- Richard Pate ... William DeLancy
- Craig J. Seath ... Dr. Dunwich

== Production ==
Principal photography took place in Scotland and is currently in post production. Like the 2013 Lord of Tears and the connected 2015 film The Unkindness of Ravens, Brewster teamed up with his partner Sarah Daly, who penned the film's script and served as the film's producer. Also akin to both films, Brewster's Hex Media launched a Kickstarter campaign to help with finishing the film.

Unlike the prior two films, The Black Gloves was shot entirely in black and white, a "noir look" that Daly stated "seemed a natural fit for the Owlman, who is this shadowy entity, always lurking in dark corners, watching.”

== Release ==
The Black Gloves premiered at 28 October 2017 London FrightFest Film Festivals All Nighter Halloween Event.

=== Critical response ===
The Black Gloves received mostly positive reviews from critics. Author Kim Newman reviewed the film, writing that "the main attraction is a slide into madness that eventually delivers a full-on scary dance sequence with oily creatures and the most savagely fearsome owl-thing yet." Starburst Magazine rated the film a score of 8/10, calling it, "a strikingly shot in black-and-white psychological horror film with elements of classic mid-20th Century classics like The Innocents, coupled with the likes of Black Swan and Argento's Suspiria." Kieran Fisher of Diabolique Magazine praised the film's performances, cinematography, costume design, and unnerving atmosphere.
