= Daniel David Stewart =

American singer and actor

- Born: California, U.S.
- Occupations: Actor, singer
- Years active: 2008–present
- Website: danielstewart.me

Daniel David Stewart is an American singer and actor known for his work in television, theatre, and musical productions. In 2015, he provided the voice of Ernst in the Broadway revival of Spring Awakening. The following year, he originated the role of Papi in the world premiere of The Band's Visit at the Atlantic Theater Company. In 2019, Stewart portrayed Milo Minderbinder in the Hulu miniseries Catch-22, directed by George Clooney. From 2021 to 2022, he appeared as NASA astronaut Nick Corrado in the Apple TV science fiction drama series For All Mankind.

== Career ==
Stewart got his professional start in 2008 in the film Corpse Run. He has also appeared in cameo roles in television shows including Man Up!, The Middle, The Goodwin Games and K.C. Undercover. He has appeared in short and featured length films, including Kids vs Monsters and The Sound of Magic.

In 2014, Stewart appeared in the Deaf West production of the Tony Award-winning musical Spring Awakening as the Voice of Ernst. He then reprised his role for the Broadway revival, and completed his run at Brooks Atkinson Theatre on January 24, 2016.

== Filmography ==
=== Film ===
Year	Title	Role	Notes
2008	Corpse Run	Gamer Teen	
2015	Kids vs Monsters	Oliver Gingerfield	
2021	Silk Road	Max	
2024	Red Right Hand	Zeke Barkley	
2025	Bart Bagalzby and the Garbage Genie	Willis	
TBA	Love Language	TBA	Post-production

=== Television ===
Year	Title	Role	Notes
2011	Man Up!	Teen	Episode: "Camping"
2013	The Middle	Steve	Episode: "Life Skills"
2013	The Goodwin Games	Salesman #2 / Pharoah / Bartender	Episode: "Hamletta"
2014	Off the Record	Detective Cole	TV movie
2015	Late Night with Seth Meyers	Voice of Ernst	
2015	K.C. Undercover	Stanley	Episode: "Stakeout Takeout"
2017	Controversy	Oliver Peck	TV movie
2017	Encore! Back to the Woods	Jack	
2019	Catch-22	Milo Minderbinder	6 episodes
2020	The Fugitive	Stamell	Main role
2021–2022	For All Mankind	Nick Corrado	8 episodes
2023	Never Have I Ever	Kade Andrews	Episode: "...had my dream stolen"
2025	Reacher	Steven Elliot	
2026	Memory of a Killer	Jeff	Main role

== Theatre credits ==
Year	Title	Role	Category	Location	Notes
2014	Spring Awakening	Voice of Ernst / Piano	Los Angeles	Deaf West Theatre	
2015	Spring Awakening	Voice of Ernst / Piano	Los Angeles	Wallis Annenberg Center	
2015–2016	Spring Awakening	Voice of Ernst / Piano	Broadway	Brooks Atkinson Theater	
2016–2017	The Band's Visit	Papí	Off-Broadway	Linda Gross Theater	
2018	The Band's Visit	Papí	Broadway	Ethel Barrymore Theatre	Temporary replacement for Etai Benson
