= HitRecord on TV =

- Genre: Variety show
- Created by: Joseph Gordon-Levitt
- Directed by: Joseph Gordon-Levitt
- Starring: Joseph Gordon-Levitt
- Country of origin: United States
- Original language: English
- No. of seasons: 2
- No. of episodes: 16

Production
- Executive producers: Jared Geller; Brian Graden; Belisa Balaban
- Production locations: Los Angeles, California; New York City (second)
- Running time: Approximately 23 minutes
- Production company: HitRecord

Original release
- Network: Pivot
- Release: January 18, 2014 – July 31, 2015

HitRecord on TV is an American television variety series created by Joseph Gordon-Levitt with executive producers Jared Geller, Brian Graden, and Belisa Balaban. The series premiered on January 18, 2014 on Pivot in the United States. The series emphasizes Internet celebrity in art history by focusing on different themes.

The satellite variety show aired new episodes five consecutive nights a week (every day except Thursday and Friday on which reruns are aired instead) after prime time and before late night for Pivot on most pay-TV and satellite/digital cable. The show is supported by TakePart.

The first three episodes were shown at 2014 Sundance Film Festival on January 18, 2014.

== Development ==
Based on hitRECord's open-collaborative approach to production, hitRECord on TV was developed as a variety show starring, created, and directed by Joseph Gordon-Levitt. Described as the online community's biggest collaborative project to date, hitRECord on TV was made from contributions from members of the hitRECord community around the world. The program was developed around featuring specific themes per episode, with requests from the community directors to provide and refine content for each theme. The last product for each episode features short films, live performances, cartoons and much more.

The first episode, "RE: Number 1", premiered on Pivot on January 18, 2014 at 10PM, and was made available for online viewing. In January 2014, Pivot announced the renewal of the series for a second season.

== Episodes ==
=== Series overview ===
| Season | Episodes | Originally released | |
| Season | Episodes | First released | Last released |
|---|---|---|---|
| 1 | 8 | January 18, 2014 | March 1, 2014 |
| 2 | 8 | June 12, 2015 | July 31, 2015 |

=== Season 1 (2014) ===
| No. overall | No. in season | Title | Original release date |
|---|---|---|---|
| 1 | 1 | "RE: THE NUMBER ONE" | January 18, 2014 |
Host Joe and thousands of contributors around the world discuss the concept of "one", from ideas like singular organisms in nature, solitude, unity, and first times in everything imaginable.
| 2 | 2 | "RE: FANTASY" | January 18, 2014 |
Host Joe and contributors on "fantasy", featuring an entertaining big old fashioned musical number, exploring the neuroscience of fantasy, and an animated twist on a familiar fairy tale.
| 3 | 3 | "RE: TRASH" | January 25, 2014 |
Host Joe and contributors on "trash", with an interview with the "Pope of Trash", filmmaker John Waters, some trashy music performed at the legendary Troubadour in West Hollywood, a trashy sci-fi short, and more.
| 4 | 4 | "RE: SPACE" | February 1, 2014 |
Host Joe and contributors on space and Mars, with an animated short film about a boy who can fly above it all and a visit to SpaceX, a transportation company that's trying to send humans to Mars.
| 5 | 5 | "RE: THE OTHER SIDE" | February 8, 2014 |
Host Joe and contributors discuss the concept of the "other side", including ideas such as the other side of arguments, relationships, celebrity and afterlife after death.
| 6 | 6 | "RE: GAMES" | February 15, 2014 |
Host Joe and contributors on games, featuring an epic game of Capture the Flag, exploring love games, and the gamification of politics.
| 7 | 7 | "RE: MONEY" | February 22, 2014 |
Host Joe and contributors on "money", including a music video about falling in love with money, a cartoon about money's origin, and a short film exposing how greed can affect family dynamics.
| 8 | 8 | "RE: PATTERNS" | March 1, 2014 |
Host Joe and contributors on "patterns"; with patterns everywhere around us, the HitRecord community explores and builds on ideas about patterns throughout history, family patterns, and the pattern of REmixing.

=== Season 2 (2015) ===
The second season of hitRECORD on TV was premiered on June 12, 2015 on Pivot. As with the first season, the second season will consist of eight episodes each focusing on a specific theme. The first episode of the season, "RE: THE DARK", was available for online viewing before the season's premiere on Pivot on June 12, 2015. The fifth episode, "RE: GUNS", considered the most controversial theme for the season, also became available for online viewing shortly before the episode aired on Pivot on July 10, 2015.

| No. overall | No. in season | Title | Original release date |
|---|---|---|---|
| 1 | 9 | "RE: THE DARK" | June 12, 2015 |
In the season 2 premiere, Host Joe and contributors discuss ideas about "the dark", like fearing it, dark humour, and dark thoughts, and presenting a short film about dark magic, a gathering of revelers performing a dark ritual in the woods, and a haunting music video follows the carnal transformation of a young victimized boy.
| 2 | 10 | "RE: THE NUMBER TWO" | June 19, 2015 |
Host Joe and contributors look at ideas about the "number 2", while presenting a short film about sidekicks struggling to emerge from the shadow of their superheroes, musicians picking partners or a colour-drenched music video, and second children describing what it's like being number two.
| 3 | 11 | "RE: SCHOOL" | June 26, 2015 |
Host Joe and contributors present an episode revolving around the theme of "school", with features including a 50s-style musical number about the drama of high school relationships, a documentary about the pros and cons about going to college, and the animated adventure of an unlikely prom queen.
| 4 | 12 | "RE: FIRE" | July 3, 2015 |
Host Joe and contributors on the theme of "fire", with collaborations including a handcrafted fairytale about a dragon who can’t breathe fire and a story about a hit man out for revenge in an eighties-inspired, animated music video made from over 2,000 hand painted frames.
| 5 | 13 | "RE: GUNS" | July 10, 2015 |
Host Joe and contributors on guns, kicking off with a lesson on gun safety and continuing with a series of comedic sketches, the story of Mexico's one lone gun shop, testimonials on gun laws around the world, a story about a time when riding shotgun meant actually packing heat, and one young woman's personal story about her family's reaction to the Port Arthur Massacre.
| 6 | 14 | "RE: YOUR MOM" | July 17, 2015 |
Host Joe and contributors present an episode exploring all things maternal, including a look at mothers in the animal kingdom, an animated cartoon poking fun at over-bearing "Helicopter Moms", and a music video celebrating the sexier side of motherhood.
| 7 | 15 | "RE: SECRETS" | July 24, 2015 |
Host Joe and contributors, with guest Ben Schwartz, reveal some secrets in a series of short sketches based on the confessions of real people, along with an animated music video lamenting the forbidden love between a boy, a squirrel, and her curious parents.
| 8 | 16 | "RE: THE FUTURE" | July 31, 2015 |
Host Joe and contributors on the theme of "the future," using imagination to consider how future technology might affect the way we live, and musicians from all over the world bring the season to a close with a song about hope for the future.

== Reception ==
In 2014, the series was nominated and won an Emmy Award for Outstanding Creative Achievement in Interactive Media in the area of Social TV.[12]
