= Jamie Scott Gordon =

Scottish actor and writer

Jamie Scott Gordon is a Scottish actor and writer known for the 2013 horror film Lord of Tears. He is active with the theater project The Village Pub Theatre.

== Filmography ==
=== Films ===
- Blooded (2010, as Chris)
- Making Ugly (2011, as Stark)
- Lord of Tears (2013, as Allen Milton)
- Kids vs Monsters (2015, as Taxi Driver)
- The Unkindness of Ravens (2015, as Andrew)
- Good Intentions (2015, as Josh)
- Bonejangles (2015, as Randy)
- The Black Gloves (2017, as Finn Galloway)
- Never Not Love You (2018, as David)
- Automata (2019, as Dr. Brendan Cole)
- For We Are Many (2019, as Jacob, segment "Wendigo")
- Cold Kill (2020, as Stark)
- Trauma Therapy: Psychosis (2023, as Jesse)
- The Vance Institute (2023)

=== Short films ===
- Chairs: A Farce of Death (2010, as The Boy)
- The Waster (2011, as Jeff Daniels)
- Nine Mile Creek (2019, as Prospector Stu)
- Wendigo (2019, as Jacob)

== Theatre ==
- Medusa's Snakes (2008, as Monstrous)
- Some Girls (2009, as Man)
- There Are No Blue Castles (2009, as Dr Rankin)
- The Waiting Room (2011, as Arthur)
- The Cherry Orchard (2011, as Yasha)
- Good Vibrations (2013, as Beebop)
- Scots Who Enlightened The World (2013, as James Hutton)
- Hooray For All Kinds Of Things (2015, as Ottar Proppe)
- Magnet Mixer (as Comedy Improvisor)
- Coldest Show on Earth (as Luke)
- Shakespere and Cervantes (as William Shakespeare)
- Il Timeo De Bernard P (as Moreno)
- Dick Whittington (as Captain Hawkeye)
- Alice in Wonderland (as March Hare)
