= Morgan M. Morgansen's Date with Destiny =

- Directed by: Joseph Gordon-Levitt
- Written by: Sarah Daly
- Produced by: Jared Geller
- Starring: Joseph Gordon-Levitt; Lexy Hulme; Lawrie Brewster
- Cinematography: Lawrie Brewster
- Edited by: Joseph Gordon-Levitt; Lawrie Brewster
- Music by: Nathan Johnson
- Production company: hitRECord
- Distributed by: hitRECord
- Release date: January 24, 2010 (Sundance Film Festival)
- Running time: 6 minutes
- Country: United States
- Language: English
- Budget: $4,000 (estimated)

Morgan M. Morgansen's Date with Destiny is a 2010 short romantic silent film directed, edited by and starring Joseph Gordon-Levitt. It co-stars Lexy Hulme.

It is Gordon-Levitt's directing debut. A sequel entitled Morgan and Destiny's Eleventeenth Date: The Zeppelin Zoo was released the same year.

== Plot ==
The silent film, except for narration throughout by Gordon-Levitt, follows the first date between Morgan M. Morgansen (Gordon-Levitt) and a young woman named Destiny (Hulme). Backed up by a sour-turned-sentimental waiter - or the "foodpenguin" (Brewster) - and a band of cartoon feline musicians (among others), Morgan ultimately manages to woo Destiny. After meeting with Destiny at a restaurant and ordering a cooked rabbit, Morgan discovers Destiny's vegetarianism, and decides to eat only the vegetables around the plate rather than eat the rabbit meat and appall his alarmed date. Appreciative of Morgan's sacrifice at dinner for the sake of her comfort, Destiny begins to kiss him in the street, overlooked by the approving foodpenguin. The two rush off to Morgan's abode and it is stated that Morgan, lying in bed that night, needed no longer feel alone.

== Cast ==
- Joseph Gordon-Levitt as Morgan M. Morgensen / Narrator
- Lexy Hulme as Destiny
- Lawrie Brewster as Food Penguin

== Production ==
The short was produced by Gordon-Levitt's online production company hitRECord with contributions from artists all over the world. Gordon-Levitt directed and starred in the piece which was written and conceived by Irish writer Sarah Daly. The visual effects were created by Scotland's Lawrie Brewster with illustrations from Jenyffer Maria. Nathan Johnson composed the score which was then assembled from the contributions of musicians online.

With homages to influences as varied as Lewis Carroll, Sigmund Freud and Georges Méliès.

== Premiere ==
The short film premiered at the 2010 Sundance Film Festival.

== See also ==
- Morgan and Destiny's Eleventeenth Date: The Zeppelin Zoo
