= Lawrie Brewster =

Scottish filmmaker

- Occupations: Director, producer
- Years active: 2010 - current
- Known for: Lord of Tears; The Devil's Machine; The Reign of Queen Ginnarra
- Awards: Rondo Hatton Classic Horror Award (special recognition)

Lawrie Brewster is a Scottish indie filmmaker, director and producer, known for his 2013 film Lord of Tears, which won the Audience Award at the 2013 Bram Stoker International Film Festival. He is also the director of Hex Media, a horror film production company that he runs with writer Sarah Daly, with whom he frequently collaborates, as well as technicians Michael Brewster and Tom Staunton.

In 2014 Brewster began filming The Unkindness of Ravens, which was written by Daly and stars Jamie Scott Gordon, who co-starred in Lord of Tears. The film moved into post-production during 2015 and Brewster launched a Kickstarter campaign to help with costs. Brewster also frequently works with actress Alexandra Hulme, with whom he began working in 2010 on the Morgan M. Morgansen short films.

In 2025 Brewster received a Special Recognition Award from the Rondo Hatton Classic Horror Awards for his work reviving Amicus Productions and his contributions to independent horror filmmaking.

== Filmography ==
Year	Film	Director	Producer	Editor	Cinematographer	With Daly	With Hulme	With Gordon	Notes
2010	So Brightly in the Dark	Yes	No	Yes	Yes	Yes	No	No	Short film
2010	Morgan M. Morgansen's Date with Destiny	No	Yes	Yes	Yes	Yes	Yes	No	Short film, also art director, visual effects, and actor - Food Penguin
2010	Morgan and Destiny's Eleventeenth Date: The Zeppelin Zoo	No	No	No	Yes	Yes	Yes	No	Short film, also art director, visual effects, and actor - Food Penguin
2011	White Out	Yes	Yes	Yes	Yes	Yes	No	No	
2012	Turnip Head	Yes	Yes	No	No	Yes	No	No	Short film, also art director and visual effects
2012	Empire	Yes	Yes			No	No	No	Short film
2013	Lord of Tears	Yes	Yes	Yes	No	Yes	Yes	Yes	
2015	Kids vs Monsters	No	Yes	No	No	Yes	Yes	No	
2015	The Unkindness of Ravens	Yes	Yes	Yes	No	Yes	No	Yes	
2017	The Black Gloves	Yes	Yes	Yes	No	Yes	Yes	Yes	
2018	The Devil's Machine	Yes	No	No	No	Yes	Yes	Yes	Originally titled Automata
2019	For We Are Many	Yes	Yes	No	No	No	No	No	anthology film, with Andrew Ionides, Brad Watson, Mitch Wilson, Carlos Omar De Leon, Matthan Harris, Mark Logan
2022	Dragon Knight	Yes	Yes	Yes	No	Yes	No	No	
2022	Ghost crew	Yes	Yes	Yes	No	Yes	No	No	Also known as Linger. Starring Tom Staunton, Megan Tremethick and Gordon Holliday
2022	The Vance Institute	Yes	Yes	Yes	No	No	No	Yes	Per Nerdly, the film was given an unauthorized re-edit to make the 2023 film Trauma Therapy: Psychosis, per a request by Brewster, the director was listed as "Gary Barth".
2024	The Slave and the Sorcerer	Yes	Yes	Yes	No	Yes	No	No	Starring Chris Black, Megan Tremethick, Briony Monroe and Jonathan Hansler.
2025	The Reign of Queen Ginnarra	Yes	Yes	Yes	No	Yes	No	No	Starring Megan Tremethick, Andrew Gourlay and Dorian Todd.
2025	In the Grip of Terror	Yes	Yes	Yes	No	Yes	No	No	A new Amicus Productions horror anthology starring Jane Merrow, Laurence R. Harvey, and Megan Tremethick.
2025	The Reign of Queen Ginnarra	Yes	Yes	No	No	Yes	No	No	Co-written with Daly, won the Rondo Hatton Classic Horror Award for Best Independent Film
