= Morgan and Destiny's Eleventeenth Date: The Zeppelin Zoo =

- Directed by: Joseph Gordon-Levitt
- Written by: Sarah Daly
- Produced by: Jared Geller
- Starring: Joseph Gordon-Levitt; Lexy Hulme; Lawrie Brewster; Channing Tatum
- Cinematography: Lawrie Brewster
- Edited by: Joseph Gordon-Levitt
- Music by: Nathan Johnson
- Production company: hitRECord
- Distributed by: hitRECord
- Release date: 2010
- Running time: 7 minutes
- Country: United States
- Language: English

Morgan and Destiny's Eleventeenth Date: The Zeppelin Zoo is a short romantic silent film directed and edited by Joseph Gordon-Levitt and starring himself, Lexy Hulme and Channing Tatum. It is the second installment in the Morgan M. Morgansen series. The first film, Morgan M. Morgansen's Date with Destiny premiered at Sundance in 2010 and the positive response spurred the makers to continue the saga.

== Plot ==
Morgan (Gordon-Levitt) and Destiny (Hulme) pay a visit to an ornate zoo aboard an airship, where they find the old foodpenguin, now costumed in a giant panda outfit, has attained a job selling zoo-related souvenirs. At the zoo, Morgan is suddenly faced with tough opposition: the advances of Destiny's ex-boyfriend, Lionel (Tatum). When Destiny's cat, the cartoonized Madame Ballafur, suddenly disappears aboard the airship, a scramble ensues for Destiny's affections, with Morgan and Lionel both seeking the "purrpet" in hopes of returning her to Destiny in triumphant victory. Neither Morgan nor Lionel, however, can find the cat until the foodpenguin directs Morgan's attention to Madame Ballafur, sleeping comfortably in the cage of a huge lion; but Morgan's further progress is obstructed by the reappearance of Lionel. The two men engage in a buffoonish fistfight which is only ended when the foodpenguin hurls a food skewer toward Lionel, upon which he trips and falls. Morgan, clearly the weaker of the two men, now sees his chance to flee from Lionel and enter the lion's cage in order to grab up Ballafur and carry her back to Destiny. Lionel, however, tries to thwart his opponent by whistling loudly and startling the lion. Picking up Ballafur, Morgan runs away from the enraged lion and escapes at the last moment by vaulting himself over and out of the cage. Lionel tromps away, defeated, and Morgan and Destiny walk off with Ballafur, both relieved.

== Cast ==
- Joseph Gordon-Levitt as Morgan M. Morgensen / Narrator
- Lexy Hulme as Destiny
- Channing Tatum as Lionel
- Lawrie Brewster as Food Penguin

== Production ==
Gordon-Levitt directed and starred in the piece which was, once again written by Irish screenwriter Sarah Daly. The visual effects were created and conceived by Scotland's Lawrie Brewster with illustrations from principal artist Jenyffer Maria and the contributions of online collaborators. Nathan Johnson composed and assembled the score, again using pieces contributed by musicians at hitRECord.

== Premiere ==
Morgan & Destiny's Eleventeeth Date: The Zeppelin Zoo premiered at the South by Southwest festival in 2010.
