= Effective Altruism Global =

Annual philanthropy events

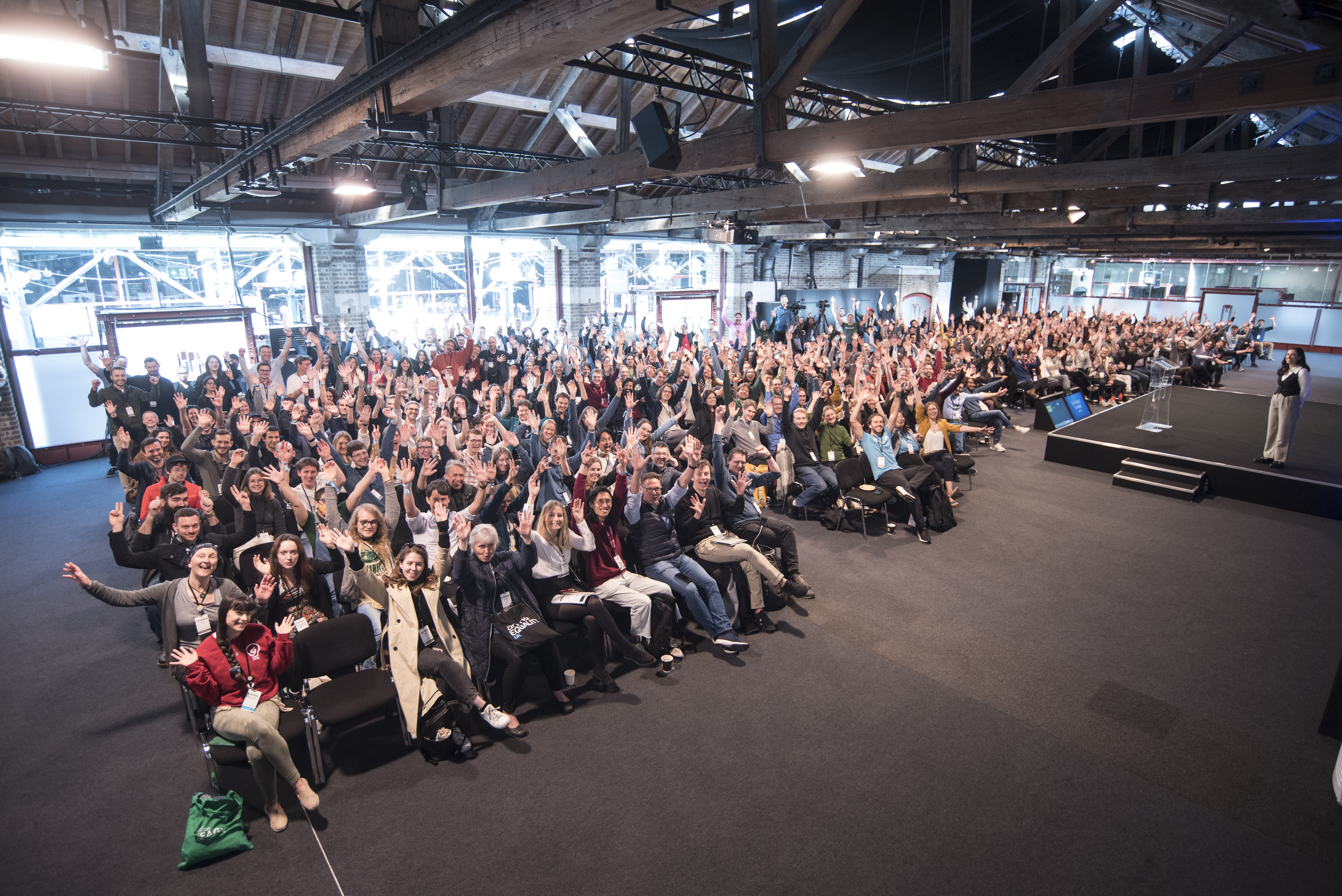
Crowd at the EA Global: London event in 2023

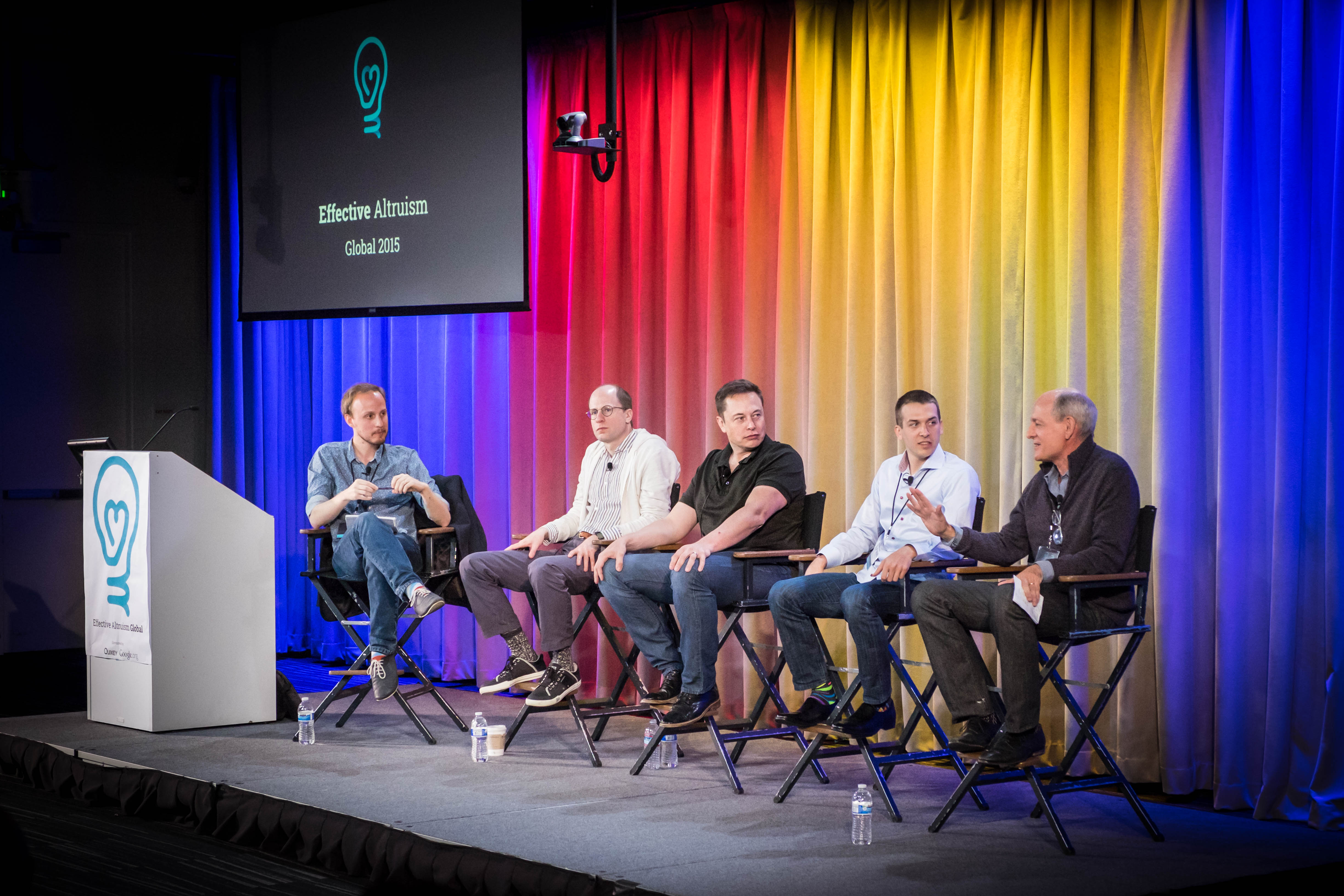
Panel with Nick Bostrom, Elon Musk, Nate Soares, and Stuart Russell during EA Global 2015

Effective Altruism Global, abbreviated EA Global or EAG, is a series of annual events that focus on the effective altruism movement. They are organised by the Centre for Effective Altruism.

== History ==
The first Effective Altruism Summit was hosted in 2013.

In 2015, there were three main EA Global events. The largest was a three-day conference that took place on the Google campus in Mountain View, California, with speakers including entrepreneur Elon Musk, computer scientist Stuart J. Russell, and Oxford philosophy professor William MacAskill. There were also conferences in Oxford and Melbourne. According to MacAskill, the nature of the conferences improved coordination and ideological diversity within effective altruism. Talks included subjects such as global poverty, animal advocacy, cause prioritization research, and policy change. There were also workshops on career choice, Q&A sessions, and panels on running local effective altruism chapters.

One of the key events of the Google conference was a moderated panel on existential risk from artificial general intelligence. Panel member Stuart Russell stated that AI research should be about "building intelligent systems that benefit the human race". Vox writer Dylan Matthews, while praising some aspects of the conference, criticized its perceived focus on existential risk, potentially at the expense of more mainstream causes like fighting extreme poverty.
