= Centre for Effective Altruism =

Non-profit effective altruist organization

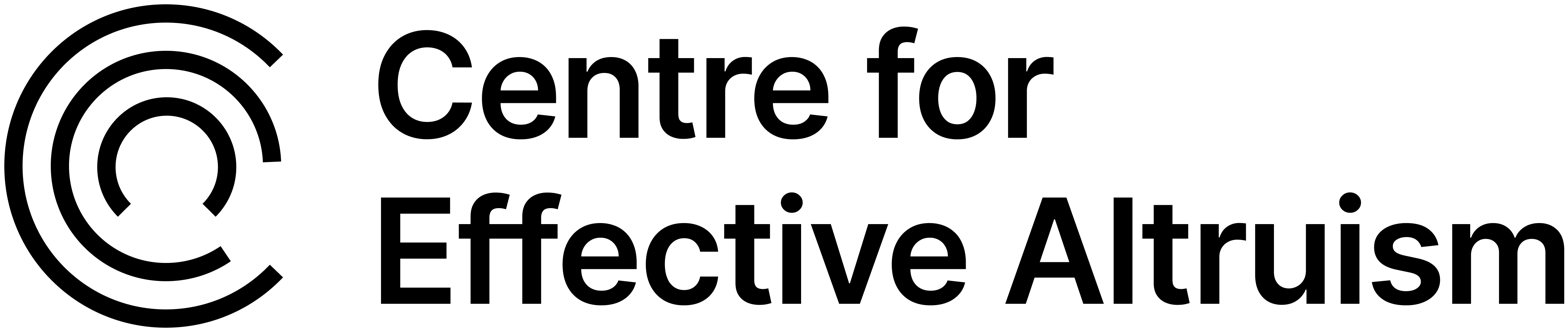
- Abbreviation: CEA
- Formation: 2012; 14 years ago
- Founders: Toby Ord; William MacAskill
- Founded at: Oxford, England
- Type: Charity
- Registration no.: 1149828
- Purpose: building and supporting the effective altruism community
- Headquarters: Trajan House, Mill Street, Oxford, OX2 0DJ, UK
- CEO: Zach Robinson
- Parent organisation: Effective Ventures
- Website: www.centreforeffectivealtruism.org

The Centre for Effective Altruism (CEA) is an Oxford-based organisation that builds and supports the effective altruism community. It was founded in 2012 by William MacAskill and Toby Ord, both philosophers at the University of Oxford. CEA is part of Effective Ventures, a federation of effective altruism projects.

== History ==
CEA's founding was prompted by the need to set up an umbrella organization under which Giving What We Can and 80,000 Hours could be incorporated. In late 2011, the members of those two organizations met to discuss how this new entity should be named, and the name "Centre for Effective Altruism" was adopted. At the time, the movement that would later be called "effective altruism" did not yet have a standard name—this was the first use of the term in its current sense. CEA was registered as a charity the following year.

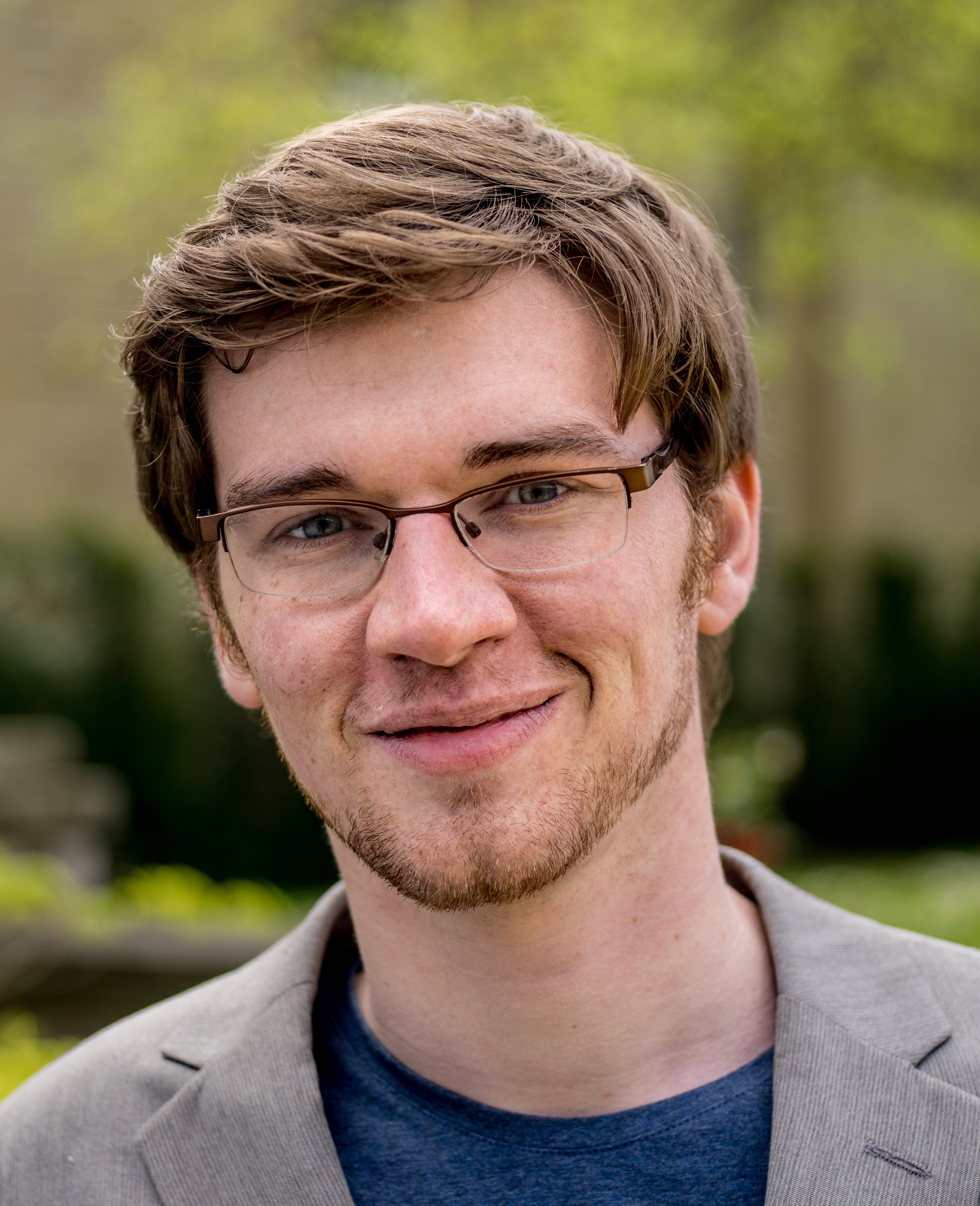
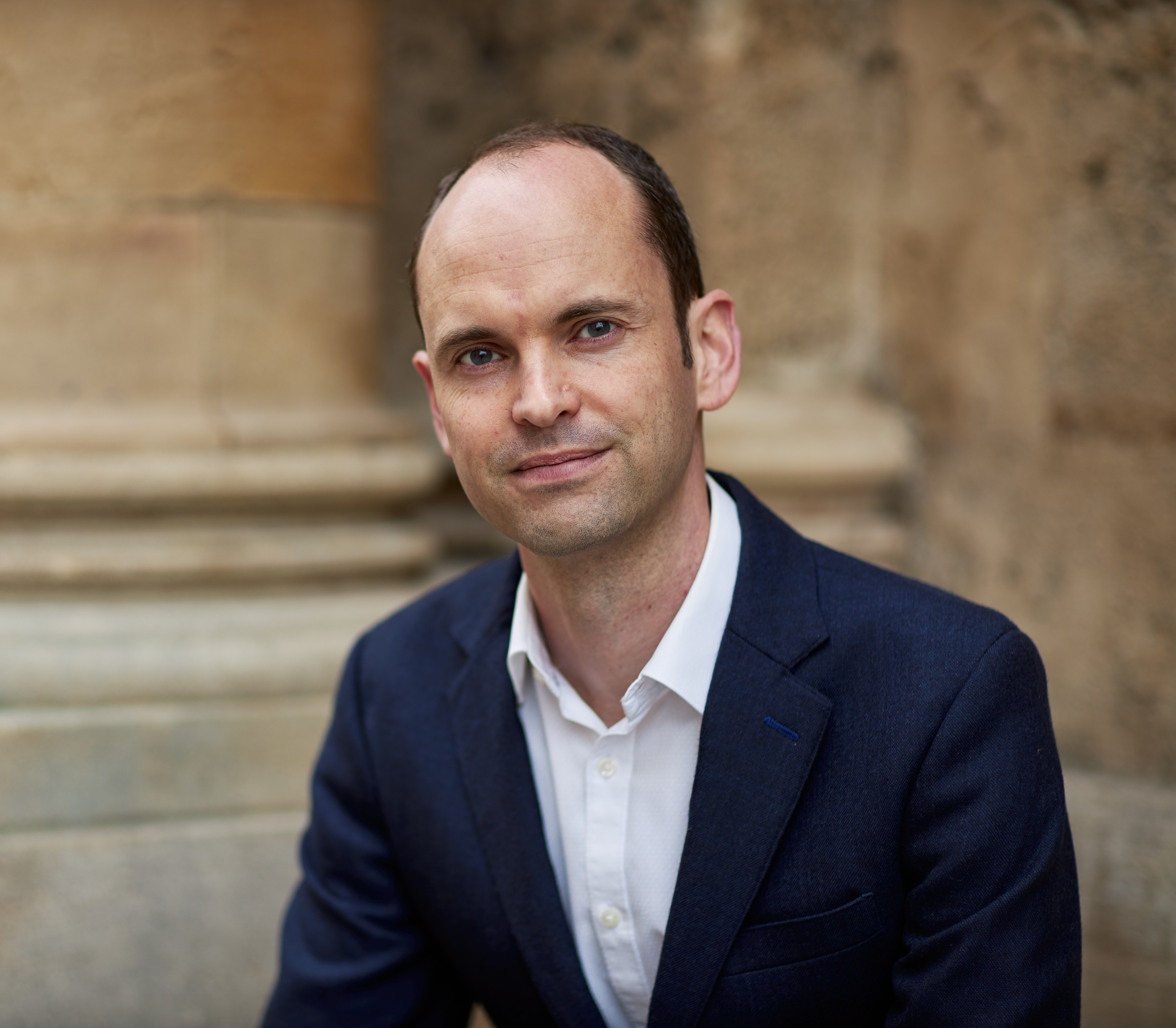
William MacAskill and Toby Ord founded the Centre for Effective Altruism in 2012.

In 2015 and 2016, CEA incorporated several projects, including Effective Altruism Global and Giving What We Can, and began to function as a centralized organization, rather than merely as an umbrella. Sam Bankman-Fried joined CEA as director of development in late 2017, leaving shortly thereafter to fund Alameda Research. In 2018, CEA launched a new version of the Effective Altruism Forum, based on the LessWrong codebase.

In 2022, the division of CEA providing operations support and fiscal sponsorship to several projects changed its name to "Effective Ventures". The rest of CEA now operates as one of Effective Ventures’ many projects, which besides Giving What We Can and 80,000 Hours, include EA Funds, the Forethought Foundation, the Centre for the Governance of AI, Longview Philanthropy, Asterisk, Atlas Fellowship, and Non-trivial. CEA continues to pursue its mission to build and nurture a global community of people who are thinking carefully about the world's biggest problems and taking impactful action to solve them.

In 2022, the Centre for Effective Altruism launched and fiscally sponsored Asterisk, a quarterly magazine.

== Activities ==
As of 2022, CEA's primary activities include organizing the Effective Altruism Global conference series; building and maintaining the Effective Altruism Forum and the effective altruism landing page; funding and advising hundreds of effective altruism groups across the world.

CEA's offices are in Trajan House, a building that also accommodates many other organizations connected with the effective altruism movement, including the Forethought Foundation, the Centre for the Governance of AI, the Global Challenges Project, and the Global Priorities Institute; the latter is also part of the University of Oxford.

CEA's budget for the year 2021 was $28 million.

== See also ==
- Effective Altruism Global
- GiveWell
- Impact investing
