= Don Jon =

2013 film by Joseph Gordon-Levitt

- Theatrical release poster
- Directed by: Joseph Gordon-Levitt
- Written by: Joseph Gordon-Levitt
- Produced by: Ram Bergman
- Starring: Joseph Gordon-Levitt; Scarlett Johansson; Julianne Moore; Rob Brown; Glenne Headly; Brie Larson; Tony Danza
- Cinematography: Thomas Kloss
- Edited by: Lauren Zuckerman
- Music by: Nathan Johnson
- Production companies: Voltage Pictures; HitRecord Films; Ram Bergman Productions
- Distributed by: Relativity Media
- Release dates: January 18, 2013 (Sundance); September 27, 2013 (United States)
- Running time: 90 minutes
- Country: United States
- Language: English
- Budget: $5 million
- Box office: $41.3 million

Don Jon is a 2013 American romantic comedy-drama film written and directed by Joseph Gordon-Levitt in his feature-length directorial debut. It stars Gordon-Levitt, Scarlett Johansson, and Julianne Moore. The supporting cast includes Rob Brown, Glenne Headly, Brie Larson, and Tony Danza. The film follows a man whose porn addiction gives him unrealistic romantic and sexual expectations, prompting him to search for happiness and intimacy with his potential true love.

Don Jon premiered at the Sundance Film Festival on January 18, 2013, and was released by Relativity Media in the United States on September 27. It grossed $41 million worldwide on a budget of $5 million and received generally positive reviews from critics.

== Plot ==
Jon Martello is a young Italian-American bartender and a modern-day Don Juan living in New Jersey. He enjoys his independent lifestyle, which consists of working out, maintaining his apartment, driving his 1972 Chevrolet Chevelle SS, going to church with his family, engaging in casual sex, and excessively masturbating to hardcore pornography. Though he claims to enjoy sex, he finds it inferior to porn and even finds his daily life interrupted by flashbacks of watching porn.

While at a nightclub with his friends, Jon meets Barbara Sugarman, a beautiful woman from an affluent background. Despite flirting, she declines his offer for a one-night stand. Jon becomes interested in her, hoping that sex with her will be more satisfying than his usual hookups, and asks her out after finding her on Facebook. Barbara insists on a more serious relationship, which proceeds for over a month and without sex. She pushes Jon to take an evening community college class to obtain a career outside the service industry, and he indulges her love of romance films, which he dismisses as fantasy. They meet each other's friends and families, and Jon's parents are immediately smitten by her and hope the two will marry.

Jon and Barbara finally have sex, but he is still dissatisfied. She catches him watching porn and is disgusted, but he convinces her it was a joke email sent by a friend. As she spends more time at his home, he resorts to watching porn on his cell phone. He takes great satisfaction in cleaning his apartment, but Barbara considers it beneath him and insists he have her family's maid do it. At his class, Jon catches his middle-aged classmate Esther crying alone; when she sits next to him to explain herself, she sees porn on his phone. She later shocks him by showing him an erotic video which she believes depicts sex in a healthier way. Barbara discovers the porn in Jon's laptop browser history, causing a fight; he insists that all men watch porn, but she breaks up with him.

Jon watches an increased amount of porn and becomes emotionally withdrawn and erratic, which leads to an incident of road rage. His friend persuades him to finish his college class, where he sees Esther again. After class, he has sex with Esther in her car and discusses his breakup with her. She asks him why he loves porn, and he reveals that he gets "lost" in porn in a way he does not with a partner, and has been consuming porn since he was a child. He insists he is not addicted to porn, and Esther suggests masturbating without it for a week, which he discovers he cannot do. Esther says porn has given him a skewed idea of what real sex is, and he does not intimately connect with his partners because he focuses merely on his own satisfaction. After suggesting they take a bath together at her home, Esther starts crying and does not join him, revealing that her husband and son died in a car crash 14 months prior. Their emotional connection deepens their intimacy, and Jon experiences truly satisfying sex for the first time.

Jon later tells his priest that he has stopped watching porn, and though he had premarital sex with Esther, it felt special and unlike his previous connections; he is disillusioned when the priest does not acknowledge his substantial improvement. He finally tells his family about his breakup with Barbara. While his parents are upset, his sister Monica bluntly tells them that Barbara clearly only wanted to date someone she could control. Jon meets with Barbara and apologizes for lying to her, but asserts that her expectations were demanding of him and unattainable. She insists that a man should make any sacrifice for a woman he loves and tells Jon not to call her again.

With neither of them interested in conventional love or marriage, Jon and Esther begin dating and "lose" themselves while being intimate.

== Cast ==
- Joseph Gordon-Levitt as Jon Martello Jr.
- Scarlett Johansson as Barbara Sugarman
- Julianne Moore as Esther
- Tony Danza as Jon Martello Sr., Jon's father
- Rob Brown as Bobby
- Glenne Headly as Angela Martello, Jon's mother
- Brie Larson as Monica Martello, Jon's younger sister
- Jeremy Luke as Danny
- Italia Ricci as Gina
- Paul Ben-Victor as Priest
- Lindsey Broad as Lauren
- Anne Hathaway as Emily Lombardo
- Channing Tatum as Conner Verreaux
- Meagan Good as Hollywood Actress #2
- Cuba Gooding Jr. as Hollywood Actor #2
- Sarah Dumont as Sequins
- Rizwan Manji as Teacher

== Production ==
Development for Don Jon began in 2008, when Joseph Gordon-Levitt wrote early notes about the film. Rian Johnson gave him feedback during the writing process and reviewed several cuts of the film, while Christopher Nolan cautioned him against both directing and starring in the film due to the extra challenges it would bring. Gordon-Levitt credited his experience directing short films for his media group HitRecord for teaching him what he needed to know to make Don Jon, and said that he hopes to make films in a more collaborative way in the future. Principal photography for Don Jon began in May 2012.

In the United States, the film was originally certified NC-17 due to some explicit pornography that the main character watches. Gordon-Levitt decided to remove some of the more graphic scenes to qualify for an R rating because he felt the original rating would cause people to think the movie was about pornography.

== Reception ==
=== Box office ===
Don Jon grossed $24.5 million in North America and $16.5 million internationally, for a total worldwide gross of $41 million on a budget of $3–5.5 million.

=== Critical response ===
Rotten Tomatoes reports an approval rating of 80% based on 202 reviews, with a rating average of 6.8/10. The website's critical consensus states: "Don Jon proves to be an amiable directing debut for Joseph Gordon-Levitt, and a vivacious showcase for his co-star, Scarlett Johansson." Metacritic gives a weighted average score of 66 out of 100 based on 41 critics, indicating "generally favorable" reviews. Audiences surveyed by CinemaScore on its opening weekend gave Don Jon an average grade of "C+" on an A+ to F scale.

Don Jon received very positive reviews at the Sundance Film Festival. Entertainment Weekly managing editor Jess Cagle called the film "one of the best movies I saw at the fest" and wrote "Funny, touching, smart, and supremely confident, Don Jon is also Gordon-Levitt's feature directorial debut, and it establishes him as one of Hollywood's most exciting new directors." William Goss of Film.com praised Gordon-Levitt for his "assured style" as both director and screenwriter. Edward Douglas of ComingSoon.net gave high praise to the screenplay. Consensus of the film when it was played at the Sundance Film Festival, as noted by Odie Henderson, was that Don Jon was a "more fun version" of the 2011 film Shame.

Scarlett Johansson and Julianne Moore received praise for their performances. Stephanie Zacharek of The Village Voice praised the film, writing, "There's no dancing in Gordon-Levitt's writing-directing debut, Don Jon, although the movie is so heavily reminiscent—in the good way—of Saturday Night Fever that an arm-swinging paint-can reverie wouldn't be out of place."

=== Accolades ===
Award	Category	Subject	Result
Bombay International Film Festival	Golden Gateway	Joseph Gordon-Levitt	Nominated
COFCA Award	Breakthrough Film Artist	Brie Larson	2nd place
Chicago Film Critics Association Award	Most Promising Filmmaker	Joseph Gordon-Levitt	Nominated
Denver Film Critics Society Award	Best Comedy Film		Nominated
Georgia Film Critics Association	Breakthrough Award	Brie Larson	Won
Golden Trailer Awards	Don LaFontaine Award for Best Voice Over	Mark Woolen & Associates	Nominated
Golden Trailer Awards	Most Original Trailer	J.D. Funari; Dylan O'Neil; Sohini Sengupta; Mark Woolen & Associates	Nominated
Gotham Award	Best Actress	Scarlett Johansson	Nominated
IGN Summer Movie Awards	Best Comedy Film		Nominated
Independent Spirit Award	Best First Screenplay	Joseph Gordon-Levitt	Nominated
Jupiter Award	Best International Actor	Joseph Gordon-Levitt	Nominated
Key Art Award	Best Trailer—Audio/Visual	J.D. Funari; Dylan O'Neil; Sohini Sengupta; Mark Woolen & Associates	2nd place
MTV Movie Award	Best Kiss	Scarlett Johansson	Nominated
MTV Movie Award	Best Kiss	Joseph Gordon-Levitt	Nominated
Phoenix Film Critics Society Award	Breakthrough Performance Behind the Camera	Joseph Gordon-Levitt	Nominated
Prism Awards	Performance in a Feature Film	Joseph Gordon-Levitt	Nominated
Prism Awards	Feature Film—Mental Health		Nominated

== Home media ==
Don Jon was released on DVD and Blu-ray on December 31, 2013.
