= Kids vs Monsters =

- Theatrical release poster
- Directed by: Sultan Saeed Al Darmaki
- Written by: Sarah Daly
- Produced by: Adamo Paolo Cultraro; Lawrie Brewster
- Starring: Elaine Hendrix; Francesca Eastwood; Malcolm McDowell; Daniel David Stewart
- Cinematography: Darrin Webb
- Music by: Jeff Marsh
- Production companies: Dark Dunes Productions; Hex Media; Taormina Films
- Distributed by: MarVista Entertainment
- Release date: September 29, 2015
- Running time: 101 minutes
- Country: United States
- Language: English

Kids vs Monsters is a 2015 American fantasy comedy film that was directed by Sultan Saeed Al Darmaki and is his directorial debut. The film was released on video on demand on September 29, 2015.

== Synopsis ==
The film centers around six children that have been sent to a strange, mysterious house by their wealthy parents, who feel that their children pose more of a burden than a blessing. While in the house they will face seven monsters, each of which are intent on battling the children.

== Cast ==
- Elaine Hendrix as Mary
- Keith David as Barry
- Daniel David Stewart as Oliver Gingerfield
- Malcolm McDowell as Boss Monster
- Francesca Eastwood as Candy
- Lance Henriksen as Heinrich
- Armand Assante as Damian
- Anna Akana as Daisy
- Adrian Paul as Greg Lovett
- Christopher Atkins as Charles
- Mary Birdsong as Maxine
- Richard Moll as Butler
- Lee Purcell as Francine Gingerfield
- Michael Bailey Smith as Mr. Beet
- Candace Elaine as Cecilia Sealskin
- Sydney Endicott as Molly Sealskin
- Bridger Zadina as David

== Reception ==
Commonsensemedia panned the film, writing "Tedious, awful horror-comedy for kids is unwatchable." Starpulse tried to be more upbeat, stating that they enjoyed the film despite it appearing to be "set up for failure" and that "Whether it's the out of nowhere animated introductions of the cavalcade of creatures, the presence of icons like Malcolm McDowell, Lance Henriksen and especially the ever-underused and scene-stealing Richard Moll, or just the sheer laughs that come out of obtuse situations and embarrassing dialogue, there's an engaging quality to the film that can't just be ignored."
