= HitRecord =

Online collaborative media platform

- Type: Private, for-profit
- Industry: Creative industry: film, music, publishing
- Founded: June 20, 2004
- Founder: Joseph Gordon-Levitt; Dan Gordon-Levitt
- Headquarters: U.S.
- Owner: Joseph Gordon-Levitt
- Number of employees: 20
- Website: hitrecord.org

HitRecord (pronounced /ˈhɪt rɪˈkɔːrd/; often stylized as HITREC●RD) is an online collaborative media platform founded and owned by actor and director Joseph Gordon-Levitt. The company uses a variety of media to produce such projects as short films, books, and DVDs. HitRecord has produced such films as Don Jon and the short films Morgan M. Morgansen's Date with Destiny and its sequel Morgan and Destiny's Eleventeenth Date: The Zeppelin Zoo.

== History ==
In 2005, actor Joseph Gordon-Levitt started the site with his brother, Dan. It began as a way for them to solicit feedback for videos they posted, but as time went on they opened the platform up to other creative people who wanted to review and remix their and others' work.

Rather than just exhibiting and admiring each others work as isolated individuals, we gather here to work on projects together. Having someone take creative liberty with what I've done, it's just fascinating. It's like, 'Wow they really got it.' Or they didn't get it. You can really tell, based on the art that they make. Much more than what the box office was.

— Joseph Gordon-Levitt

In January 2010 at the Sundance Film Festival, HitRecord launched its new website and introduced its new professional production methodology, allowing contributing artists to be paid for their work. He invited audiences to collectively collaborate with him in the filmmaking process, and create, record, and remix each other's art with the goal of creating cohesive short multimedia work that would have a special screening at the end of the Festival. That year, Joseph sent out $50,000 worth of checks to its contributors. The site now hosts nearly 80,000+ members and pulls in about 1,000 videos, songs, text pieces and artworks daily.

The company's logo is the record symbol, which Gordon-Levitt can be seen wearing frequently in interviews, at events and appearances. The actor/founder says "that round REC button became a symbol, a metaphor for taking things into my own hands and doing it."

HitRecord's work was also featured at 2010 SxSW and at the 2012 Sundance Film Festival.

== Products ==
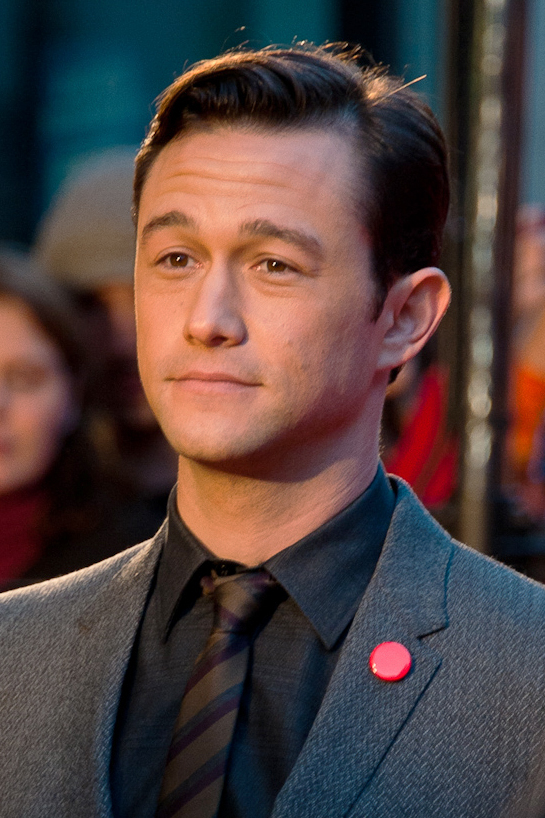
Founder Gordon-Levitt at the London Film Festival in October 2013, wearing the HitRecord logo button.

=== Feature films ===
- Don Jon (2013)

==== Short films ====
- Morgan M. Morgansen's Date with Destiny (2010)
- Morgan and Destiny's Eleventeenth Date: The Zeppelin Zoo (2010)
- Jelly Babies With SFX (2012)
- Good Nights – Stop Motion (Final version) (2012)
- They Can't Turn the Lights Off Now, Episode 2 - Sundance 2012
- Yes Were Sinking – Sundance 2012
- And A New Earth REPRISE – Sundance 2012
- November (Tiny film) (2012)
- Wicked Witch – Sundance 2012
- Strawberry Bootlaces – Sundance 2012
- Mademoiselle Noir (2) (2012)
- A Man With A Turnip For A Head – Sundance 2012
- Flickering Lights Reprise (2013)

==== hitRECord on TV ====
The show premiered on January 18, 2014, at 10pm on Pivot. It is hosted by Joseph Gordon-Levitt, and the series will feature short films, live conversations and performances. $50,000 is set aside from the budget of each episode to compensate contributing artists (426 contributing artists in Episode 1).

In 2014, the series was nominated and won an Emmy Award for Outstanding Creative Achievement in Interactive Media in the area of Social TV.

=== Books ===
The Tiny Book of Tiny Stories 2010 was self-published in 2010 by hitrecord.org. Featuring 45 contributors from 2,312 contributions to the Tiny Stories collaboration. This edition of the Tiny Book of Tiny Stories 2010 was sold exclusively via HitRecord's website and carries no ISBN.

The Tiny Book of Tiny Stories: Volume 1 was released on December 6, 2011. Gordon-Levitt, known within the HitRecord community as RegularJOE, directed thousands of collaborators to tell tiny stories through words and art. With the help of the entire creative collective, Gordon-Levitt gathered, edited and curated over 8,500 contributions into this collection of original art from 67 contributors.

Volume 1 saw its sequels when HitRecord released The Tiny Book of Tiny Stories: Volume 2 on November 13, 2012 and The Tiny Book of Tiny Stories: Volume 3 in 2013. Volume 2 featured 62 contributors from some 14,946 contributions.

In May 2012, HitRecord published Little Red Riding Hood Redux, the adaptation of the classic fairy tale with art, essays, and paper doll cut-outs from 66 contributors.

The Tiny Book of Tiny Stories: Volume 1 and the book of RECollection: Volume 1 are both available on iTunes.

=== Anthology ===
RECollection: Volume 1 is a collection of a book, a DVD and a CD released on September 20, 2011. It features contributions of 471 collaborators is what and is the very first anthology of HitRecord's work. The book is 64 full-color pages of poetry, prose, paintings, photography, comical curiosities, non-sequiturs, and bed-time stories. While the DVD is a collection of 36 short films created under the direction of Gordon-Levitt (and sometimes starring in). It features short films, animations, music videos, "tiny stories" and records from HitRecord's various live events. The CD is a compilation of 17 collaboratively-made songs sung by various artists on Gordon-Levitt's "pretend" radio show.

=== CDs ===
==== Move on the Sun ====
Move on the Sun, released September 11, 2012, is a pop, alternative rock music CD.

1. "Move on the Sun" – 3:41
2. "Enjoy the Ride" – 3:33
3. "Downtown 81" – 3:14
4. "Anicca (Original)" – 2:44
5. "Electric Loss" – 4:24
6. "Malibu" – 4:25
7. "Wolves in the Woods" – 3:57
8. "Please Hold (Interlude)" – 0:49
9. "The Good Stay Young (Interlude)" – 0:36
10. "Diamond in the Rough" – 4:01
11. "More" – 4:26
12. "For Mallory" – 3:12
13. "No Time to Wait" (Anicca Remix) featuring Cibo Matto – 3:09
14. "The Grind" featuring Nels Cline – 7:08
15. "Why Am I So Dizzy?" featuring Joseph Gordon-Levitt – 2:24

Total length: 51:43

==== Fall Formal ====
Fall Formal (HitRecorderly #3), released April 16, 2013, is a pop, alternative rock music CD.

1. "Introduction" feat. Kid Koala & Uberband – 2:01
2. "American Scrimp n Save" feat. Sia & Regular Joe – 3:08
3. "Nothing Big" feat. Tasha Taylor & Regular Joe – 2:07
4. "Le Petit Soldat" feat. Evilolive, Themetafictionist & Regular Joe – 2:18
5. "Act 2 Introduction" feat. Kid Koala & Uberband – 1:31
6. "I Have No Cats" feat. Regular Joe & the Cats – 2:08
7. "Soul n Serotonin" feat. Tasha Taylor & Regular Joe – 3:35
8. "Finale" feat. Regular Joe – 5:37

Total length: 22:25
