= The Unkindness of Ravens =

- Film poster
- Directed by: Lawrie Brewster
- Written by: Sarah Daly
- Starring: Jamie Scott Gordon
- Production companies: 3rd Monkey Productions; Dark Dunes Productions; Lights Out Productions; Zoghogg Studios
- Release date: 27 August 2016 (FrightFest)
- Running time: 85 minutes
- Country: Scotland (United Kingdom)
- Language: English

The Unkindness of Ravens is a 2016 British horror film directed by Lawrie Brewster and starring Jamie Scott Gordon as a veteran who comes face to face with demonic ravens. The film had its world premiere on 27 August 2016 at the London FrightFest Film Festival. Before its release the horror website Bloody Disgusting marked The Unkindness of Ravens as one of their "10 Must-See Independent Horror Films of 2016".

In November 2015, Brewster released a promotional video showing people dressed in raven costumes from the film pranking walkers and sightseers in Scotland.

== Synopsis ==
Andrew (Jamie Scott Gordon) is a homeless war veteran who has been experiencing terrifying flashbacks of his time in the Army, flashbacks that contain visions of imposing raven-like creatures. These flashbacks are so intimidating that Andrew has developed a phobia of ravens and as a result he travels to a retreat in the Scottish Highlands to come to terms with his past and his fears. However, he soon discovers that this is easier said than done, as this move will bring him face to face with a supernatural force known only as the Raven Warriors.

== Cast ==
- Jamie Scott Gordon as Andrew
- Derek McIlhatton as Pte Mcilhatton
- Dougie Clark as Lee
- Amanda Gilliland as Angela
- Mark Hunter as Pte Hunter
- D.T. Wilson as Hostage
- Ross Campbell as Rebel Soldier
- Farooqi Muskwati as Rebel Commander
- Raphael Zanders-McNeil as Rebel Soldier
- Jamie Harrison-Grundy as Rebel Soldier
- Benjamin Ferguson as Lost Soul
- David Izatt as Lost Soul
- Craig J. Seath as Lost Soul
- Michael Brewster as 'The Ravens Are Coming' Lost Soul
- David Ross as Lost Soul

== Development ==
While developing the film Daly and Brewster were inspired by figures from Norse and Celtic mythology such as the Valkyries and The Morrígan. Filming took place during 2014 in Fife, Edinburgh, and Perthshire, and moved into post-production in 2015. To help with costs, Brewster opened a crowdfunding campaign through Kickstarter, with the goal to raise £40,000. The campaign was successful and marked the first Scottish crowdfunding campaign to raise such a large amount of money and the highest funded British horror film on Kickstarter.

== Reception ==
Horror film critic Kim Newman reviewed The Unkindness of Ravens, writing that it was "a demanding, complicated film which might well require repeat viewings to parse fully – but this team are doing something interesting and unusual at a budget level where it would be easier to turn out a standard slasher-in-the-woods." SciFiNow also wrote a review, commenting that the film had its flaws but that there was "a lot to admire here" and praised its "impressive visuals bolstered by a fantastic lead performance".
