= Skitters =

Skitters or Skitter may refer to:

- Skitters, a species of alien in Robert Rodat's television series Falling Skies
- An old Scottish word for diarrhoea
- The super-villain Skitter, the main character in Worm (web-serial)
