= Jane Street Capital =

American market making firm

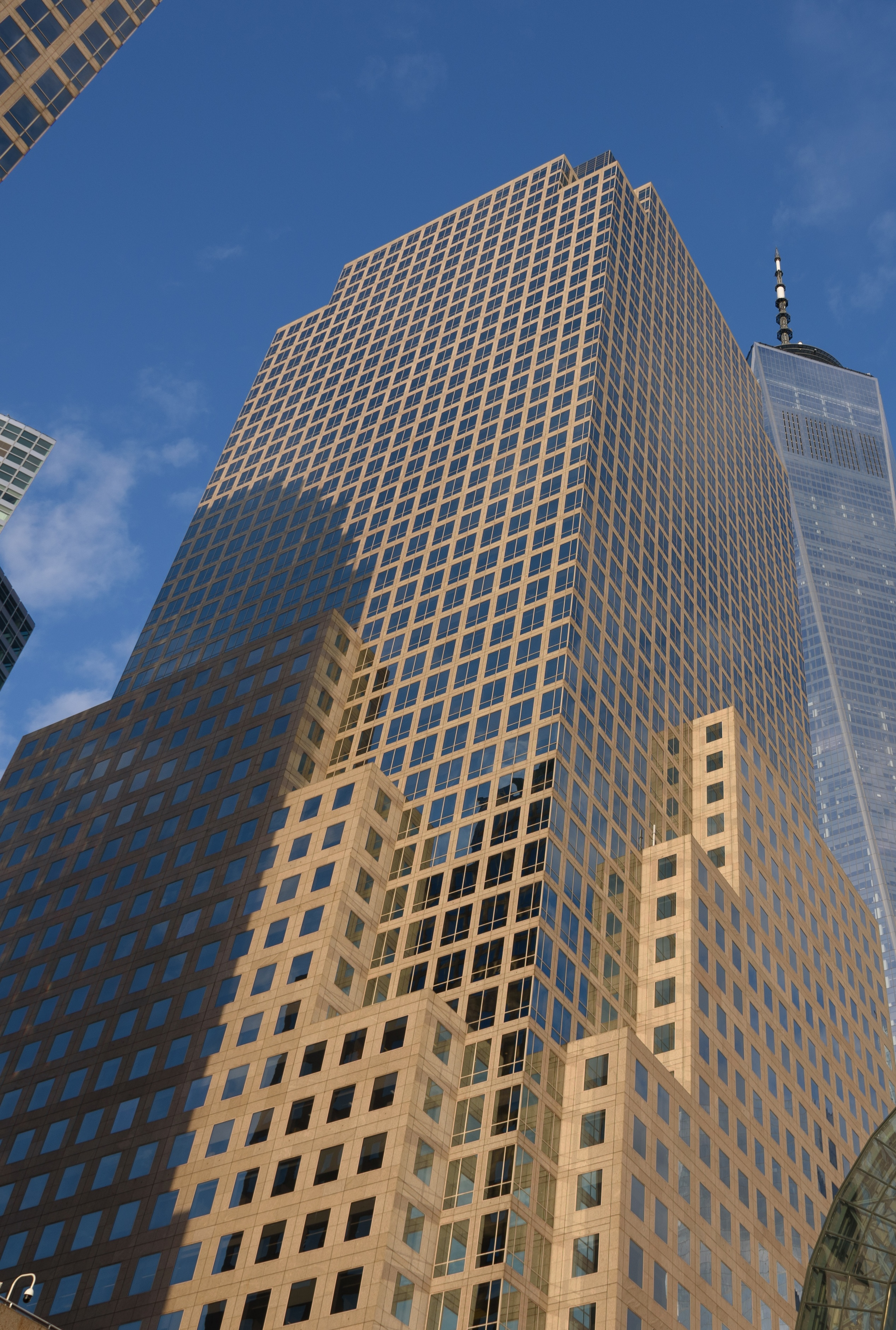
- Headquarters at 250 Vesey Street in Manhattan
- Type: Private
- Industry: Financial services
- Founded: August 31, 1999; 27 years ago
- Founders: Tim Reynolds; Robert Granieri; Marc Gerstein; Michael Jenkins
- Headquarters: 250 Vesey Street, New York City, U.S.
- Products: High-frequency trading, Market maker
- Revenue: c. US$39.6 billion (FY2025)
- Number of employees: 3,000 (2024)
- ASN: 14969
- Website: janestreet.com

Jane Street Capital is an American electronic market making company headquartered in Manhattan, New York City. It is one of the largest market making firms in the United States along with Virtu and Citadel Securities. It employs approximately 3,000 people across its global offices, and trades across more than twenty countries.

Jane Street originally traded American depositary receipts but has since traded exchange-traded funds, commodities, index, fixed income, and derivative products. The firm does not maintain a standard management structure, with its workforce and leadership co-operating like an "anarchist commune".

== History ==
Jane Street was co-founded by Tim Reynolds, Robert Granieri, Marc Gerstein, and Michael Jenkins in 1999. Reynolds, Granieri, and Jenkins were former traders at Susquehanna International Group, while Gerstein was a developer at IBM. The firm's name was chosen by its founders after Jane Street in Greenwich Village, which they selected at random; the company has never been headquartered on the street. Jane Street was sued by Susquehanna for poaching top talent with proprietary information, but no action has been taken since the filing. Granieri is the only founder still at the company, as of 2026.

== Leadership culture ==
The company is informally led by a group of 30 or 40 senior executives and has historically not maintained a CEO. All employees are paid based on the firm's collective profits, not personal trading gains.

In 2025, Jane Street employs approximately 3,000 employees, with its headquarters located in New York City’s Financial District's 250 Vesey Street.

In November 2020, Jane Street hosted a market prediction competition with a $100K prize pool that ran until August 2021. The stock trading data in the Jane Street dataset provided for this competition has been used in research studies aimed at improving trading decision-making.

=== Technology ===
Jane Street uses OCaml for its operations, contributing to open-source libraries, including an open-source OCaml compiler. Jane Street’s use of OCaml has been paired with increased operational reliance on Python for machine learning.

== Trading activities ==
Jane Street traded ADRs before moving into equity options and ETFs, with ETFs becoming the main focus. Throughout the late 2000s, Jane Street started trading fixed income, futures, commodities, and equity options.

Jane Street is not known for creating detailed year-long plans. Instead, Jane Street expands into neighboring markets incrementally. In the second quarter of 2025, Jane Street reported $10.1 billion in net trading revenue and $6.9 billion in net profit, setting a record for the highest trading revenue in a quarter. In 2024, Jane Street averaged $2 trillion in equity trading volumes per month. In July 2026, the firm suffered its "worst monthly loss ever," as it lost approximately $15 billion in part due to its investments in Situational Awareness, an AI-focused hedge fund created by former Open AI researcher Leopold Aschenbrenner.

=== Exchange-traded funds ===
In 2024, Jane Street accounted for 41% of the bond ETF trading volume. It held 24% of the primary US-listed ETFs, 16% in the non-primary market US-listed ETFs, and 17% of secondary market activity in Europe.

=== Commodities ===
In 2022, Jane Street held an $8.1 million position on commodities, increasing to $16.6 million in 2023. In Jane Street’s 2024 bond docs, they did not publicly state their intent to expand into commodities.

=== Fixed income ===
In 2024, Jane Street averaged $230 billion in monthly fixed income trading volume.

=== Options ===
In 2024, Jane Street was responsible for around 8% of Options Clearing Corporation's transactions.

=== Retail flow ===
In August 2025, Jane Street handled the second most non S&P 500 orders and third most S&P 500 for Robinhood Markets. Jane Street paid $61.3 million for stock flow and $15.2 million for derivatives to Robinhood Markets as a fee to control order flow.

== Controversies ==
=== London Metal Exchange lawsuit ===
In June 2022, Jane Street and Elliott Investment Management sued the London Metal Exchange (LME) for cancelling US$4 billion in nickel trades during a period of high volatility. The case was dismissed by the High Court of Justice in November 2023, and an appeal to the dismissal was rejected in October 2024. The Financial Conduct Authority later fined the LME in March 2025 for mishandling the excessive volatility.

=== Millennium Management lawsuit ===
Jane Street filed suit against two former Jane Street employees at Millennium Management, accusing them of stealing trade secrets, primarily of its Indian market operations. The suit was settled in December 2024 for an undisclosed amount.

=== Indian market manipulation allegations ===
In July 2025, the Securities and Exchange Board of India (SEBI) alleged that Jane Street used multiple entities for market manipulation and barred it from accessing the market. On July 14th, 2025, Jane Street put $560 million into an escrow account as part of a request to the Securities Appellate Tribunal (SAT) to resume trading activities.

SEBI alleged that Jane Street used one entity to acquire substantial quantities of bank stocks at market open, increasing the value of the Bank Nifty index, while a separate entity simultaneously held derivatives that would benefit from a later decline in that index. Near the expiry of the derivatives, the bank stocks were allegedly sold by Jane Street, causing a decline in the Bank Nifty and generating profits from the derivatives. SEBI further claimed that Jane Street raked in Rs 36,000 crore from undetected algorithmic trading. Jane Street denied all wrongdoing, stating it was basic index arbitrage.

On July 21, 2025, SEBI lifted the trading ban placed on Jane Street. In September 2025, Jane Street filed an appeal to request more documents related to a continued investigation by SAT, which was later denied in November 2025.

=== Connections to South Sudan coup attempt ===
Jane Street faced scrutiny in June 2025 over its co-founder, Robert Granieri, facing allegations of funding an attempted coup against the government of South Sudan by Peter Ajak and Abraham Keech. The matter was resolved with no charges being brought against Granieri.

=== Terraform lawsuit ===
In February 2026, the post-bankruptcy manager of Terraform Labs filed a lawsuit in the United States District Court for the Southern District of New York alleging that Jane Street had "abused market relationships to rig the market in its favor" in destabilizing trades that ultimately led to Terraform Labs' bankruptcy in 2022. Jane Street denied wrongdoing and filed a motion to dismiss the lawsuit in April 2026.

== Notable past employees ==
- Sam Bankman-Fried, co-founder of FTX and convicted fraudster
- Ophelia Bauckholt, quantitative trader associated with the Zizian rationalists
- Caroline Ellison, co-founder of FTX
- Brett Harrison, CEO of trading technology firm Architect Financial Technologies
- Zvi Mowshowitz, writer who covers topics in artificial intelligence
