= Center for Applied Rationality =

US-based nonprofit organization

- Formation: 2012; 14 years ago
- Type: Nonprofit research institute
- Legal status: 501(c)(3) tax exempt charity
- Location: Berkeley, California, U.S.
- President: Anna Salamon
- Website: rationality.org

The Center for Applied Rationality (CFAR) is a nonprofit organization based in Berkeley, California that hosts workshops on rationality and cognitive bias. It was founded in 2012 by Julia Galef, Anna Salamon, Michael Smith and Andrew Critch, to improve participants' rationality using "a set of techniques from math and decision theory for forming your beliefs about the world as accurately as possible". Its president is Anna Salamon.

== Activities ==
CFAR began as a spin-off of the Machine Intelligence Research Institute. It is part of the rationality movement surrounding Eliezer Yudkowsky's web site LessWrong, from which CFAR originated. Paul Slovic and Keith Stanovich have served as advisors.

In 2016, it announced that it would focus on improving the thinking skills of people working to reduce existential risk from artificial intelligence.

According to CFAR, it held about 60 workshops from 2012 to early 2020 and began offering a revised program in 2025. A scholarship funded by a co-founder of Skype, Jaan Tallinn, has been used to send selected Estonian students to workshops held by CFAR. The group also taught classes for Facebook and the Thiel Fellowship.

CFAR's training draws upon fields such as psychology and behavioral economics in an effort to improve people's mental habits. Writing in The New York Times Magazine in 2016, Jennifer Kahn found the techniques useful in changing her own habits, but criticized the workshop's groupthink, jargon and lack of privacy. In 2016, Vice reported that a small randomized trial conducted by CFAR, involving 50 participants, found reduced neuroticism and increased self-efficacy among those who attended a workshop. The findings were based on surveys of participants and their loved ones.

== Sonoma County incident ==
On November 15, 2019, four people dressed in Guy Fawkes masks were arrested for allegedly barricading off Westminster Woods, a wooded retreat where CFAR was holding an event. According to police, the suspects were uncooperative and spoke incoherently. The protesters were associated with a splinter group of the rationalist movement that became known as the "Zizians". Their flyers alleged that CFAR's leader "discriminates against trans women", and accused CFAR of not "appreciably develop[ing] novel rationality/mental tech". By January 2025, people associated with the Zizians had been identified as suspects or persons of interest in an attempted murder in November 2022 and four killings in 2023 and 2025, including the killing of a U.S. Border Patrol officer in a shootout. Two people associated with the group also died violently in these incidents.
