= Slate Star Codex =

Blog focused on psychology, philosophy, artificial intelligence, and futurism

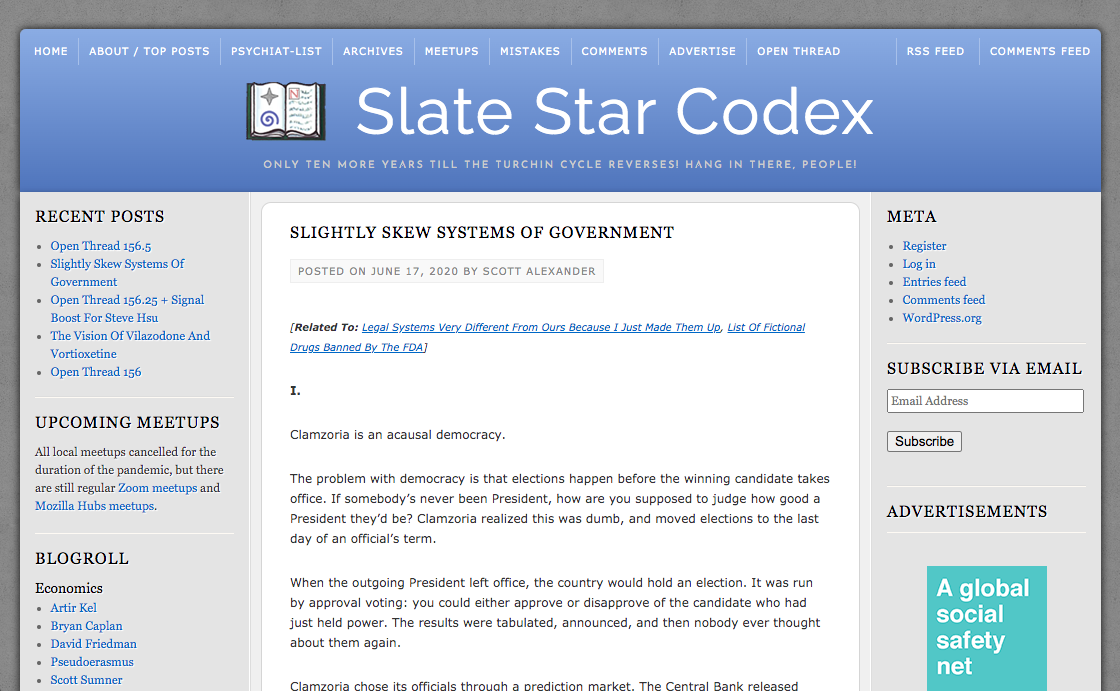
- Screenshot of the Slate Star Codex home page prior to deletion
- Website type: Blog
- Available in: English
- Successor: Astral Codex Ten
- Creator: Scott Alexander
- Website: www.slatestarcodex.com [formerly] www.astralcodexten.com [currently]
- Launched: February 12, 2013; 13 years ago
- Current status: Active (as Astral Codex Ten, Slate Star Codex is online but inactive)

Astral Codex Ten (ACX), formerly Slate Star Codex (SSC), is a blog focused on science, medicine (especially psychiatry), philosophy, politics, and futurism. The blog is written by Scott Alexander Siskind, a San Francisco Bay Area psychiatrist, under the pen name Scott Alexander.

Slate Star Codex was launched in 2013 and was temporarily discontinued on June 23, 2020. In July 2020 the blog was partially back online, with the content restored but commenting disabled. The successor Substack blog, Astral Codex Ten, was launched on January 21, 2021.

== Author ==
The site was a primary venue of the rationalist community and also attracted wider audiences. The New Statesman characterizes it as "a nexus for the rationalist community and others who seek to apply reason to debates about situations, ideas, and moral quandaries." The New Yorker describes Alexander's fiction as "delightfully weird" and his arguments "often counterintuitive and brilliant". Economist Tyler Cowen calls Alexander "a thinker who is influential among other writers". OpenAI co-founder and CEO Sam Altman has praised the blog and characterized it as "essential reading among 'the people inventing the future' in the tech industry," per The New York Times.

The New Yorker states that the volume of content Alexander has written on Slate Star Codex makes the blog difficult to summarize, with an e-book of all posts running over nine thousand pages in PDF form. Many posts are book reviews (typically of books in the fields of social sciences or medicine) or reviews of a topic in the scientific literature. For example, the March 2020 blog post "Face Masks: Much More Than You Wanted To Know" analyzes available medical literature and comes to a conclusion that contrary to early guidance by the CDC, masks are likely an effective protection measure against COVID-19 for the general public under certain conditions. Some posts are prefaced with a note on their "epistemic status", an assessment of Alexander's confidence in the material to follow.

Alexander also blogged at the rationalist community blog LessWrong, and wrote a fiction book in blog format named Unsong. Alexander published a revised version of Unsong on May 24, 2024. In 2026, Sam Kriss described Alexander in his article for Harper's Magazine:

Alexander is a titanic figure in this scene [among rationalists]. A large part of the subculture coalesced around his blog, formerly Slate Star Codex, now called Astral Codex Ten. Readers have regular meetups in about two hundred cities around the world. His many fans—who include some extremely powerful figures in Silicon Valley—consider him the most significant intellectual of our time, perhaps the only one who will be remembered in a thousand years. He would probably have a very easy time starting a suicide cult. In person, though, he’s almost comically gentle.

== Content and themes ==
=== Effective altruism ===
In 2017, Slate Star Codex ranked fourth on a survey conducted by Rethink Charity of how effective altruists first heard about effective altruism, after "personal contact", "LessWrong", and "other books, articles and blog posts", and just above "80,000 Hours." The blog discusses moral questions and dilemmas relevant to effective altruism, such as moral offsets (the proposition that good acts can cancel out bad acts), ethical treatment of animals, and trade-offs of pursuing systemic change for charities.

=== Artificial intelligence ===
Alexander regularly writes about advances in artificial intelligence and emphasized the importance of AI safety research. In the long essay "Meditations On Moloch", he analyzes game-theoretic scenarios of cooperation failure like the prisoner's dilemma and the tragedy of the commons that underlie many of humanity's problems and argues that AI risks should be considered in this context. In 2025, Alexander together with AI researcher Daniel Kokotajlo and others published AI 2027, a detailed scenario forecast describing possible developments in AI between 2025 and 2027.

=== Controversies and memes ===
In "The Toxoplasma of Rage", Alexander discusses how controversies spread in media and social networks. According to Alexander, memes that generate a lot of disagreement spread further, in part because they present an opportunity to members of different groups to send a strong signal of commitment to their cause. For example, he argues that PETA, with its controversial campaigns, is better known than other animal rights organizations such as Vegan Outreach because of this dynamic. Another example of this cited by Alexander is the Rolling Stone article "A Rape on Campus".

=== Shiri's scissor ===
In the short story "Sort By Controversial", Alexander introduces the term "Shiri's scissor" or "scissor statement" to describe a statement that has great destructive power because it generates wildly divergent interpretations that fuel conflict and tear people apart. The term has been used to describe controversial topics widely discussed in social media.

=== Anti-reactionary FAQ ===
The 2013 post "The Anti-Reactionary FAQ" critiques the work and worldview of the neoreactionary movement, arguing against the work of Curtis Yarvin (whose views include a belief in natural racial hierarchies and a desire to restore feudalism). Alexander's essays on neoreaction have been cited by David Auerbach and Dylan Matthews as explanations of the movement.

=== Lizardman's constant ===
In the 2013 post "Lizardman's Constant is 4%", Alexander coined the term "Lizardman's Constant", referring to the approximate percentage of responses to a poll, survey, or quiz that are not sincere. The post was responding to a Public Policy Polling statement that "four percent of Americans believe lizardmen are running the Earth", which Alexander attributed to people giving a polling company an answer they did not really believe to be true, out of carelessness, politeness, anger, or amusement. Alexander suggested that polls should include a question with an absurd answer as one of the options, so anyone choosing that option could be weeded out as a troll.

=== Grey tribe ===
Alexander coined the term "grey tribe" (or "gray tribe") to describe the rationalist community, as a contrast with the use of red and blue as political labels in the United States. He described the grey tribe as "typified by libertarian political beliefs, Dawkins-style atheism, vague annoyance that the question of gay rights even comes up, eating paleo, drinking Soylent, calling in rides on Uber, reading lots of blogs, calling American football 'sportsball', getting conspicuously upset about the War on Drugs and the NSA, and listening to filk"; the terms and the values they represented became popular in Silicon Valley, and "grey tribe" was adapted as a descriptor for that group's syncretic political beliefs.

== The New York Times controversy ==
Alexander used his first and middle name alone for safety and privacy reasons, although he had previously published Slate Star Codex content academically under his real name. In June 2020, he deleted all entries on Slate Star Codex, stating that a technology reporter from The New York Times (NYT) intended to publish an article about the blog using his full name. Alexander said that the reporter told him that it was newspaper policy to use real names, and he referred to it as doxing. The New York Times responded: "We do not comment on what we may or may not publish in the future. But when we report on newsworthy or influential figures, our goal is always to give readers all the accurate and relevant information we can." The Verge cited a source saying that at the time when Alexander deleted the blog, "not a word" of a story about SSC had been written. The Poynter Institute's David Cohn interpreted this event as part of an ongoing clash between the tech and media industries, reflecting a shift from primarily economic conflicts to fundamental disagreements over values, ethics, and cultural norms.

Prior to the article's publication, several commentators argued The New York Times should not publish Alexander's name without good reason. Writing in National Review, Tobias Hoonhout said the newspaper applied its anonymity policy inconsistently, noting that "in a profile published earlier this year of 'Chapo Trap House,' a popular socialist podcast hosted by unofficial Bernie Sanders surrogates, the Times identified one of the podcast's co-hosts as 'Virgil Texas,' explaining that 'he lives and works under that pseudonym.'" The New Statesman's Jasper Jackson wrote that it was "difficult to see how Scott Alexander's full name is so integral to the NYT's story that it justifies the damage it might do to him", but cautioned that "before we make that call, it might be a good idea to have more than his word to go on." As reported by The Daily Beast, the criticism by Alexander and his supporters that the paper was doxing him caused internal debate among The New York Times' staff.

Supporters of the site organized a petition against release of the author's name. The petition collected over six thousand signatures in its first few days, including psychologist Steven Pinker, social psychologist Jonathan Haidt, economist Scott Sumner, computer scientist and blogger Scott Aaronson, and philosopher Peter Singer. Alexander wrote that he quit his job and took measures that made him comfortable with revealing his real name, which he published on Astral Codex Ten. The New York Times published an article about the blog in February 2021, three weeks after Alexander had publicly revealed his name.
