= Zizians =

American fringe rationalist group

The Zizians are an informal group of rationalists allegedly involved in six violent deaths in the United States—three in 2022 and three in 2025. The term Zizians derives from the name of Ziz LaSota, a member of the group who is sometimes characterized as their leader. The Zizians do not use this name or consider themselves to have a clearly identified leader, or even to be members of a group. They advocate a distinctive ideology including anarchism, veganism, and the notion that the hemispheres of the brain can have distinct genders and conflicting interests. They have been widely described as a cult.

Federal prosecutors say the Zizians are associated with persons of interest in the murders of four people: David Maland in Vermont (a U.S. Border Patrol agent), Curtis Lind in California (a landlord), and Richard and Rita Zajko in Pennsylvania (the parents of one of the group members). In addition, Ophelia Bauckholt and Emma Borhanian, both associates of the Zizians, were killed during altercations with Maland and Lind, respectively.

== Beliefs ==
A small offshoot of the rationalist community, Zizians hold a distinctive ideology combining anarchism, veganism, transhumanism, and radical interpretations of rationalist and effective altruism (EA) principles. They identify as "vegan anarchotranshumanists", emphasizing animal rights and viewing meat consumption as a severe ethical violation, prioritizing the preservation of all sentient life against threats like artificial intelligence (AI).

Zizians' beliefs are rooted in an interpretation of "timeless decision theory", a rationalist alternative to causal decision theory. They see it as requiring resolute opposition to perceived moral wrongs, such as blackmail or societal norms. This stance has led the Zizians to conflicts with organizations like the Machine Intelligence Research Institute (MIRI) and the Center for Applied Rationality (CFAR) over alleged ethical failings, including misuse of donor funds and anti-trans discrimination.

Zizians have unique psychological theories, such as "debucketing", aimed at liberating people from societal constraints to pursue their moral ideals, and the notion that the hemispheres of the brain can have distinct genders and conflicting interests. They claim to practice unihemispheric sleep (UHS), a form of sleep deprivation intended to "jailbreak" the mind, which they believe can enhance their commitment to their cause.

In 2018, a member committed suicide, which an anonymous rationalist alleged was caused by that member attempting UHS. LaSota later wrote a blog post claiming the member did not perform the practice correctly. In a discussion with CFAR co-founder Anna Salamon, LaSota argued in favor of UHS, pointing to the suicide as proof of its effectiveness. Zizians' adherence to "heroic responsibility" and fixation on apocalyptic scenarios, such as Roko's basilisk, drives extreme actions to uphold their moral framework, which they believe mainstream rationalists lack.

The group has been called a cult or cult-like by publications such as The Independent, the Associated Press, SFGate, and Reason. The Boston Globe and The New York Times have compared the Zizians to the Manson Family. Similarly, Anna Salamon, the director of the Center for Applied Rationality, compared the Zizian belief system to that of a doomsday cult.

The Zizians are mostly transgender or non-binary. LaSota's writings include claims that transgender women are cognitively uniquely suited for artificial intelligence safety research.

== Murders with alleged Zizian involvement ==
=== Curtis Lind ===
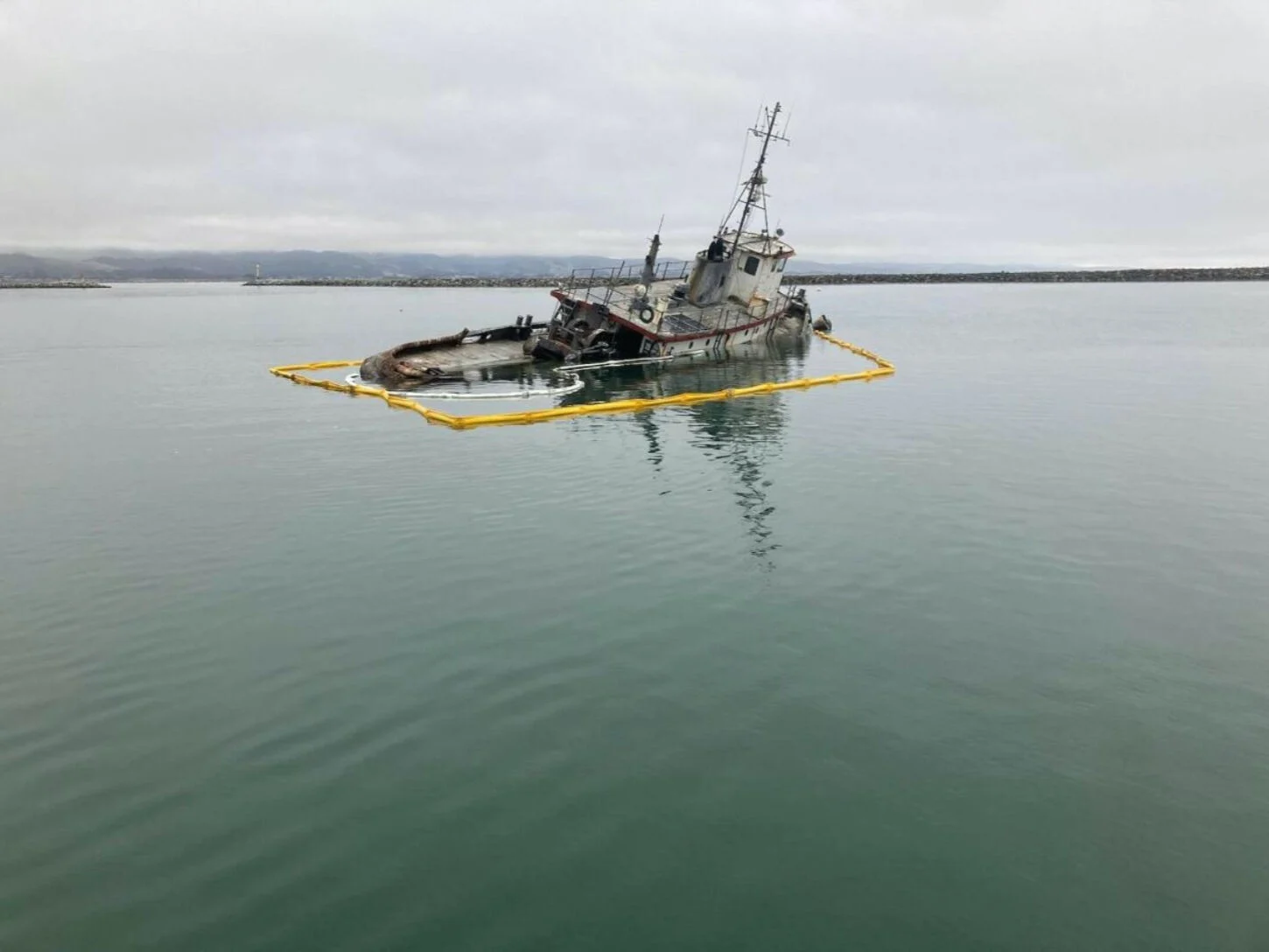
The Caleb at Pillar Point Harbor in May 2022, the same month it sank

In 2017, Ziz LaSota began recruiting a "Rationalist Fleet" of followers to live on boats on the ocean, including a World War II–era tugboat, built as the Panameta and subsequently renamed Caleb, that they sailed from Alaska to California. After struggling with the upkeep of the tugboat they had been living on, which they eventually abandoned, some members of the Zizians opted to move into trailers and converted box trucks. Curtis Lind, who docked a boat in the same harbor as the group, offered to let them move into a lot he owned in Vallejo, California. During the COVID-19 pandemic, group members allegedly stopped paying rent and placed locks on trailers meant for other tenants. When Lind sued the group for back rent, one member allegedly brandished a knife, causing Lind to start carrying a pistol.

On November 15, 2022, Lind, then 80, was, according to his own account, attacked by a group of people after being called in to fix a water leak. He said he was struck in the head, stabbed repeatedly (leaving "about 50" puncture wounds), and cut severely on the back of his neck ("like somebody was trying to cut my head off"). He was left impaled by a samurai sword, and his right eye was punctured three times, blinding him in that eye. After he regained consciousness, Lind shot two of those involved in the altercation, killing 31-year-old Emma Borhanian and wounding the other. Both had been arrested alongside LaSota at a 2019 protest against an event organized by the Center for Applied Rationality (CFAR), and Borhanian had reported LaSota's 2022 alleged drowning. Two of Lind's alleged attackers were charged with Borhanian's murder under the theory that their actions precipitated Lind's self-defense, under California's felony murder rule. After repeated delays since one of the defendants was medically unfit to stand trial, the trial is scheduled to start in January 2027. LaSota was contacted by police during the investigation but not charged.

On January 17, 2025, three days before a shootout with U.S. Border Patrol officers on the east coast, Lind was stabbed to death and had his throat slit outside his gated property in Vallejo. Lind had been expected to be an important witness in the trial of the alleged attackers for the Borhanian felony murder charge, and stopping him from testifying was alleged as the motive for his killing. Prosecutors charged a 22-year-old data scientist, who is also an associate of the Zizians, with Lind's murder. The accused dictated to reporters a statement addressed to the well-known rationalist thought leader Eliezer Yudkowsky, saying that he was a follower of Yudkowsky but is not anymore. Yudkowsky refused to read the statement and said, "Audience should not be a reward for crime."

=== Richard and Rita Zajko ===
During a welfare check on January 2, 2023, Pennsylvania state police discovered the bodies of husband and wife Richard and Rita Zajko, aged 72 and 69 respectively, at their home in Chester Heights, Pennsylvania. Autopsies found that Rita had a gunshot wound in the back of her head and Richard had wounds in his right hand and temple. Based partly on a recording by a neighbor's doorbell camera, it was concluded they had been killed on December 31.

The Zajkos' daughter had begun talking to LaSota in 2022, and the two bonded over their "mutual grief and desire for justice" over Borhanian's death. She is alleged to have purchased guns found at the scene of Maland's killing and to have been in contact with a person of interest in Lind's murder. On June 24, 2026, the daughter was charged with two counts of first-degree murder in the killings of her parents.

=== David Maland ===
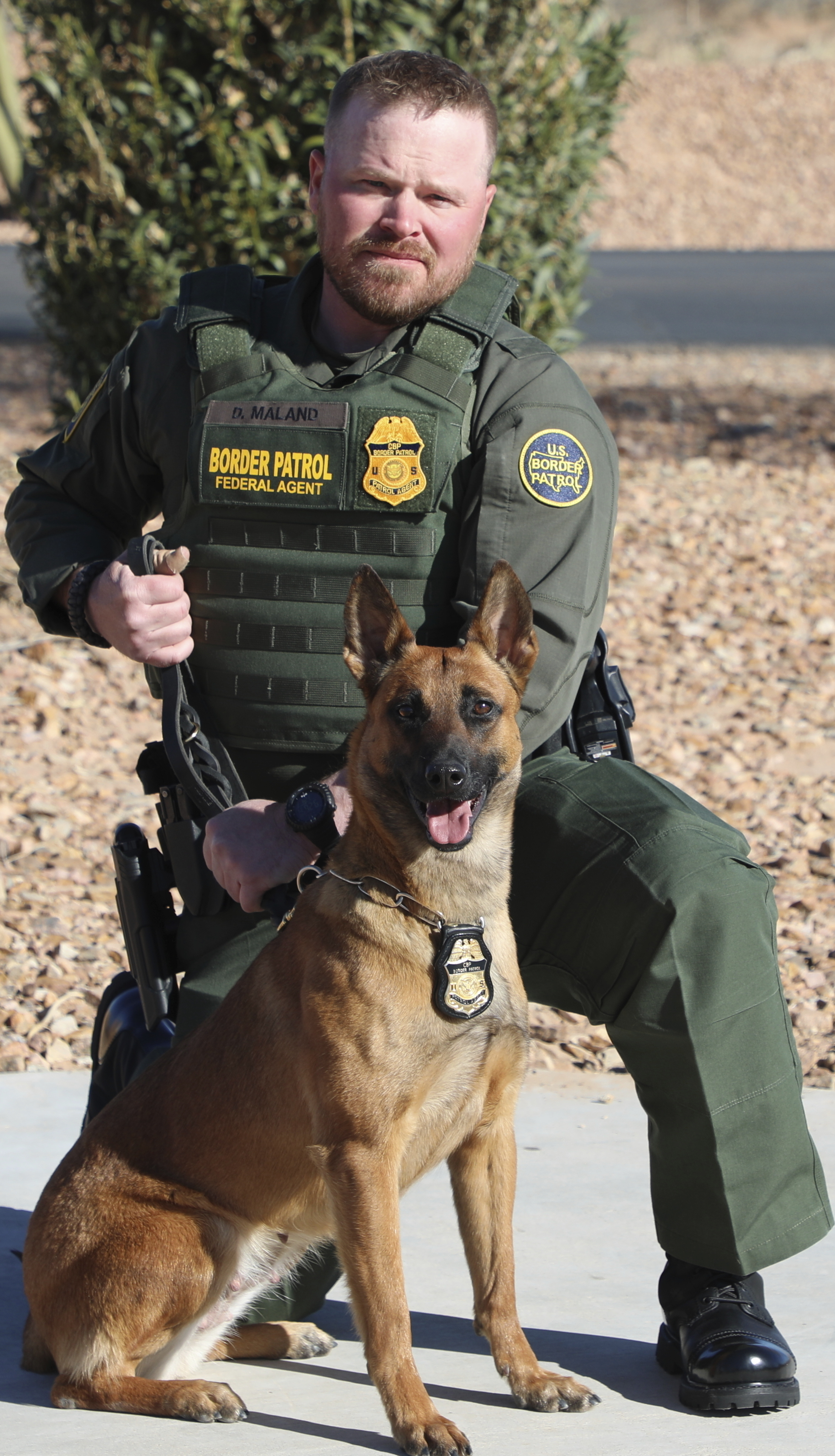
Maland, c. 2022

On January 20, 2025, after a traffic stop, United States Border Patrol agent David Christopher Maland and at least one other Border Patrol agent engaged in a shootout with Bauckholt and another Zizian, leading to Maland's and Bauckholt's deaths and wounding the other member. Bauckholt and the other member were traveling south on Interstate 91 in Coventry, Vermont, when they were pulled over. They were put under "periodic surveillance" nearly one week before the shooting after they were reported to be armed and wearing all-black tactical clothing when checking in to their hotel. The case has been connected to the killings of Lind and the Zajkos due to connections between the suspects.

==== Background ====
Before traveling to Vermont, Bauckholt and the other member stayed in separate Airbnb rentals in Chapel Hill, North Carolina. Both have been described as having cut off all contact with friends in fall 2023 and May 2024. Homeland Security Investigations agents had been conducting "periodic surveillance" of them since January 14.

A hotel employee in Lyndonville, Vermont, reportedly contacted law enforcement about the duo after seeing one of them carrying "an apparent firearm in an exposed carry holster". Both wore "all-black, tactical style clothing with protective equipment". After the report, Homeland Security agents contacted the duo, who refused to speak with them extensively. They said they were in Vermont only to purchase real estate. The duo checked out of the Lyndonville hotel and were seen five days later in Newport, Vermont, with one of them carrying a handgun. The next day, hours before the shootout, the two were seen at a Walmart, with Bauckholt buying aluminum foil.

After the shooting, authorities found ammunition, a helmet, night-vision monoculars, a tactical belt with a holster, a pair of walkie-talkies, a magazine loaded with cartridges, and shooting-range targets in their car. Smartphones were also found, wrapped in aluminum foil, apparently to prevent their phones from being tracked. Their handguns were reportedly bought by an associate in Mount Tabor, Vermont.

==== Shootout ====
Around 3:15 p.m., Agent David Maland initiated a traffic stop on I-91 southbound, about 15 kilometers from the border with Canada, with a blue 2015 Toyota Prius registered in North Carolina to conduct an immigration inspection. According to accounts by law enforcement, Bauckholt, a German citizen registered as the car's owner, appeared in a Homeland Security database to have an expired visa. Bauckholt's visa was in fact current. Prosecutors allege that the other member drew a handgun and fired at least two shots at the agent during the stop and that Bauckholt also attempted to draw a firearm. At least one Border Patrol agent shot the duo. Maland and Bauckholt were pronounced dead at the scene while the other member was taken to a hospital and later arrested.

Maland, 44, was a United States Air Force veteran. According to his family, he had been planning to marry his partner. Maland was an active security officer at the Pentagon during the 9/11 attacks before handling security at Joint Base Anacostia–Bolling. He had worked for the last 15 years for the Department of Homeland Security as a border patrol agent and as a K-9 handler. Maland was the first Border Patrol agent killed by gunfire in the line of duty since 2014.

==== Reactions ====
Vermont's U.S. Senators Bernie Sanders and Peter Welch and U.S. House Representative Becca Balint issued a joint statement saying, "Our deepest condolences go out to the agent's family, and to the Border Patrol". Representative Mark Green, who chairs the House Committee on Homeland Security, issued a statement saying he was "heartbroken by the loss of Agent David Maland", adding, "We must never forget that the men and women in green on the front lines of this border crisis defend our homeland at great personal cost" and "[f]ar too often these courageous public servants, like Agent Maland, pay the ultimate price". Maland's flag-draped casket was carried by a motorcade of Border Patrol agents and Vermont State Police from Burlington, Vermont, to Albany International Airport, and flown to his family in Minnesota.

The surviving Zizian who was involved in the incident was charged in connection to Maland's death and pleaded not guilty. Federal prosecutors have filed a notice of intent to seek the death penalty. In September 2026, the trial had its first court hearing in over a year, on matters of discovery.

== Members ==
=== Ziz LaSota ===
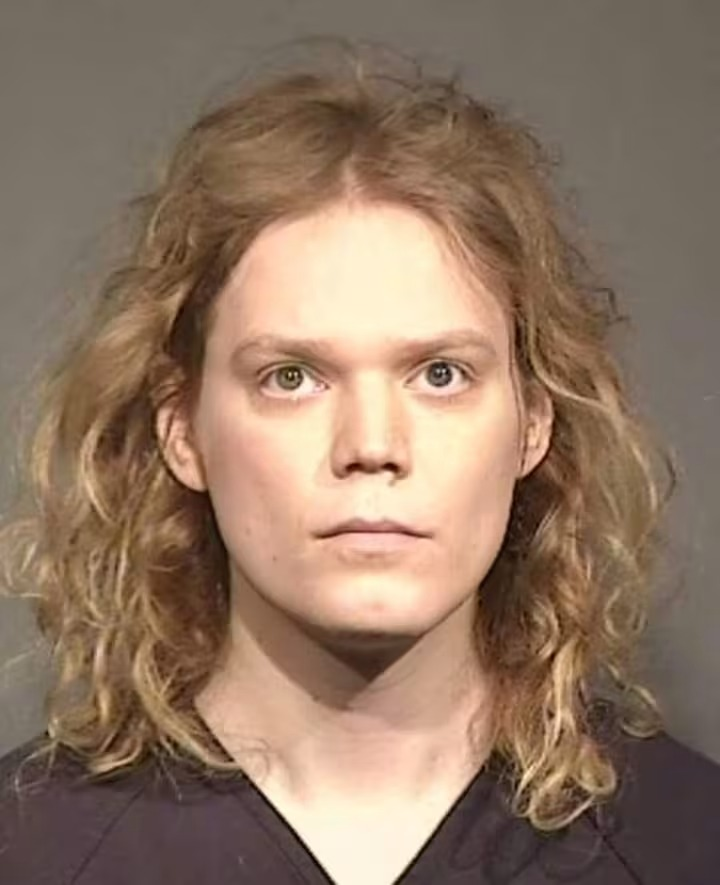
The mug shot of Ziz LaSota taken in Sonoma County, California, in 2019

Although the group members do not use this name or even consider themselves members of a group or to have a clearly identified leader, they are known as "Zizians", based on the name of their founder, Ziz LaSota, commonly known mononymously as Ziz, a reference to a character from the web serial Worm. Like many other members of the group, LaSota is transgender. According to a CFAR employee, LaSota targeted "smart, mostly autistic-ish trans women who were extremely vulnerable and isolated" for recruitment. Ziz LaSota religiously identifies as a Sith and is known for often wearing a black cape. She was an avid reader of the rationalist forum LessWrong and Eliezer Yudkowsky's digital serial Harry Potter and the Methods of Rationality.

LaSota, who was 34 years old as of 2025, earned a bachelor's degree in computer engineering in 2013 from the University of Alaska Fairbanks. She had an internship at NASA and pursued a master's degree at the University of Illinois Urbana-Champaign from 2013 to 2014 but did not graduate. LaSota moved to the San Francisco Bay Area in hopes of becoming involved with the effective altruism (EA) and rationality movements. Disaffected by high cost of housing, she and a group of fellow EA adherents sought to form a seasteading intentional community. Initially living on sailboats in the Berkeley Marina, they eventually bought an old tugboat and sailed it from Alaska to Pillar Point Harbor in San Mateo County.

During her involvement with the rationality community, LaSota became disillusioned with the leadership of community institutions such as the Center for Applied Rationality (CFAR) and the Machine Intelligence Research Institute (MIRI). LaSota and her associates claimed CFAR and MIRI discriminated against trans women, used donor money to pay off a former staffer who had accused MIRI leaders of statutory rape and a coverup, and ignored the welfare of animals in the pursuit of human-friendly artificial intelligence.

CFAR co-founder Anna Salamon tried to prevent LaSota from attending the fellowship due to strange beliefs and behavior at previous events, but was overruled by a committee. These included LaSota's theories that human consciousness can be split between the brain's two hemispheres, which may hold different values, genders, and may be "good", "evil", or both. After more CFAR staff members raised concerns, LaSota was no longer invited to the group's events.

In 2019, LaSota, Borhanian, and two associates staged a protest against a CFAR event at a retreat in Occidental, California. LaSota and Borhanian wore robes and masks, leading certain CFAR attendees to feel threatened. A 911 call led police to mistakenly believe the protesters were armed, and a group of children was at the retreat for a separate event, and the protest drew a forceful police response. After the four protesters were arrested, police mistakenly believed a fifth protester had a hatchet, and a SWAT team was deployed to evacuate the retreat; that person was later discovered to be a maintenance worker.

Fallout from the protest and the police response led to a rift between the Zizians and the rationalist community establishment: the Zizians accused CFAR employees of swatting them by falsely reporting to police that they were armed, while a member of the rationalist community published an anonymous callout coining the appellation "Zizians" and branding them as a cult. The Zizians filed a federal civil rights lawsuit against Sonoma County in which they alleged that they were wrongfully arrested, denied medication while detained, subjected to excessive force, and mocked for being transgender. The lawsuit was dismissed. In 2026, one of the four involved in the protest pleaded no contest to misdemeanor charges. In an interview with Rolling Stone, they claim to have broken contact with the Zizians in 2022 before their fatal altercation with Lind. They were not reported to be linked to any of the subsequent murders.

LaSota faked her death in a supposed boating accident in August 2022, but turned up in January 2023 in a Philadelphia hotel room where police were carrying out a search for a weapon suspected to have been used in the Zajkos' murder. LaSota was identified as the subject of an outstanding warrant in California and arrested for disorderly conduct and interfering with a police investigation. After her bail was reduced to $10,000, unsecured, she was released pending trial. She appeared in court in Pennsylvania in August 2023, but failed to appear in December 2023.

After media coverage of LaSota and associates related to David Maland's death, LaSota was recognized by the owner of a rural property in Frostburg, Maryland, where she was attempting to camp. The owner called the police, who arrested LaSota on February 16, 2025, for trespassing, obstructing an officer, and transporting firearms. She is being held in custody without bail; she requested a pretrial release, which a local judge denied. On June 18, 2025, LaSota was indicted on a federal charge of being a fugitive from justice while in possession of firearms and ammunition, which carries a prison sentence of up to 15 years. On November 24, 2025, she was arraigned in federal court in Baltimore and pleaded not guilty to the charge. In March 2026, LaSota's lawyer requested that her competency to stand trial be evaluated, citing inability to follow the proceedings and LaSota's accusing the judge of being part of an organized crime ring. The judge granted the request.

=== Ophelia Bauckholt ===
Ophelia Bauckholt was a transgender German citizen on a current visa working as a quantitative trader for Tower Research Capital in New York since October 2021. Before working at Tower, she worked as a trader at Radix Trading for two years and as an intern at Jane Street Capital. Bauckholt reportedly quit working for Tower in 2023, which put her visa's extension at risk.

Bauckholt was raised in Freiburg im Breisgau and attended the Goethe-Gymnasium school, where she was a gifted mathematician. In 2014 and in 2015, she won gold and bronze medals for the German team at the International Olympiad in Informatics. She graduated from the University of Waterloo in 2019 with a bachelor's degree in mathematics.

Bauckholt expressed interest in the rationalist community after attending a CFAR event in 2019, and reportedly cut off contact with friends in the fall of 2023. On January 20, 2025, Bauckholt was killed in a shootout in Coventry, Vermont, after being stopped by border patrol agent David Maland, who was also killed. As of early 2025, the Freiburg public prosecutor's office was investigating the circumstances surrounding Bauckholt's death, as is done whenever a German citizen dies abroad.
