= Worm (web serial) =

Fiction web-serialised novel about people with superpowers

- The header image used for the site
- Author: John "Wildbow" McCrae
- Language: English
- Genre: Superhero fiction science fiction web serial
- Publication date: 2011–2013
- Media type: Digital
- Pages: Roughly 7,000 (Based on a word count of 1,680,000)
- Text: Worm at WordPress
- Website: https://parahumans.wordpress.com/

Worm is a self-published web serial by John C. "Wildbow" McCrae and the first installment of the Parahumans series, known for subverting and playing with common tropes and themes of superhero fiction. It was McCrae's first novel. Worm features a bullied teenage girl, Taylor Hebert, who develops the superpower to control worms, insects, arachnids, and other simple lifeforms. Using a combination of ingenuity, idealism, and brutality, she struggles to do the right thing in a dark world filled with moral ambiguity.

It is one of the most popular web serials on the internet, with a readership in the hundreds of thousands. A sequel, titled Ward, was published from November 2017 to May 2020.

In October 2026, a licensed comic book adaptation of Worm was announced by IDW Publishing, with the first issue set to release on May 1, 2027.

== Publication ==
Worm was first published as an online serial with two to three chapters released every week. It began online publishing in June 2011 and continued until November 2013, totaling approximately 1,682,400 words.

The story was written at a rate comparable to a traditional book being published every month. It followed a strict publication schedule, with new chapters released every Tuesday and Saturday, and bonus chapters on Thursdays as rewards for donations. These chapters were arranged into 31 arcs, each of which covered a specific series of events over six to 12 chapters and concluded with an interlude from the point of view of a side character.

In contrast to traditional publishing, which follows a short-term model, Worm's readership grew slowly but steadily, beginning with 13 views in June 2011, the month the serial began; 26,844 monthly views a year later; and 207,833 monthly views by June 2013. Views peaked at 1,390,648 in November 2013, when the book ended, and remained steady with 693,675 monthly views even five years later.

As of 2019, Worm is being edited, and McCrae plans to produce both an eBook version and a physical book via traditional publishing.

== Backstory ==
=== Setting ===
Worm is set in a fictional, alternate universe known as "Earth Bet". The events of Earth Bet closely follow that of our own Earth until a naked, golden man named Scion appears over the ocean in 1982. Following his appearance, a fraction of humans gain superpowers if placed in a traumatic and stressful situation, known in-story as a "trigger event".

The arrival of "parahumans" in 1982 leads to a "Golden Age of Heroism", during which the majority of people with powers work for the public good. In 1989, after a parahuman dies trying to prevent a riot, superpowered serial killers, thieves, cults, and gang members begin to increasingly threaten public safety. Governments worldwide create agencies to counter parahuman criminals, including the Parahuman Response Team (PRT), in Canada and the United States.

In 1992, a giant monster launches a devastating attack on the Marun Field, Iran. To adequately prepare humanity for future attacks and to manage the growing villain population, four prominent heroes form the Protectorate, an organization subordinate to the PRT dedicated to cooperation among superheroes. Two more monsters (collectively referred to as "Endbringers") appear and begin attacking cities across the planet, causing the loss of millions of lives, as well as catastrophic and irreversible economic and geographic damage. The PRT and Protectorate are forced to treat villains more leniently in return for assistance in fighting Endbringers. Mired in bureaucracy and politics, the PRT is increasingly unable to cope with the growing frequency and brutality of parahuman crimes.

The story is set in the fictitious city of Brockton Bay, a formerly wealthy port that has severely declined after Endbringer attacks led to the collapse of the shipping industry. Due to the poverty of the area, it has a higher number of parahumans per capita than any other American city, and a number of superhuman-led gangs vie for control over the city's criminal enterprises.

=== Powers ===
Individuals who possess powers in Worm are referred to formally as "parahumans" and informally as "capes", a term referencing the general habit of parahumans to establish an alter ego and go out in costume (with or without literal "capes").

In order to acquire a power in Worm, one must suffer a trigger event: a moment of severe physical or psychological trauma. The properties of the power are influenced by the nature of the threat the individual faces and the individual's thought process at the time. Some parahumans, when placed under extreme stress reminiscent or beyond that of their initial trigger event may trigger a second time, expanding and refining their powers to increase their odds of survival.

In rare cases, multiple individuals may suffer a simultaneous trigger event known as a "cluster trigger". Cluster triggers often cause complicated and intense interpersonal relationships within the cluster, often referred to as the Kiss/Kill dynamic.

Individuals who have spent multiple years around capes will, on occasion, trigger with a similar power. These individuals are generally referred to as "second generation capes" as many are children of previous parahumans, although powers are not, strictly speaking, heritable. The mechanics behind how powers work is gradually explained throughout the story.

Alternatively, powers can be acquired through Cauldron, a shadowy and secretive group which has discovered a method to artificially induce powers. This process carries a significant risk of deformation or mutilation, with the strength or safety of powers acquired varying greatly. Individuals whose Cauldron-acquired powers result in noticeable or grotesque mutation are referred to as "Case-53s" or "monster capes".

Powers in Worm obey several arbitrary constraints. All powers can be used aggressively, regardless of manifestation. Thus, healers are incredibly rare and often as a byproduct of another power, or have other abilities suited towards combat. Another limitation is the "Manton effect": a parahuman's abilities very rarely affect both organic and inorganic material, and parahumans are instinctively protected from their own power – e.g., a power may affect the landscape, but not the people within it, or vice versa. There are instances within the setting of parahumans who have been able to bypass this effect, although the circumstances which enable this are typically difficult or dangerous to replicate, depend heavily on the individual in question and tend to suffer debilitating psychological and physiological effects.

== Synopsis ==
Taylor Hebert is a 15-year-old parahuman who has developed the power to sense and control insects and other small invertebrates following a traumatic event at the hands of bullies. She lives in the fictional city of Brockton Bay, a hotspot of parahuman activity, and seeks to become a superhero. On her first night out in costume, she defeats a superpowered gang leader and is subsequently mistaken for a villain by a team of teenage parahuman thieves known as the Undersiders, who work jobs for a mysterious benefactor. Taylor joins the team, hoping to learn the identity of their boss before turning them in to the authorities. However, Taylor grows increasingly close to the Undersiders, whilst having repeatedly poor run-ins with the Parahuman Response Team (PRT), the United States of America's parahuman law enforcement agency, and the superheroes of the PRT's sister organization, the Protectorate. She ultimately finds herself unable to betray the Undersiders and becomes fully committed to them, adopting the moniker "Skitter" and abandoning her dream of becoming a superhero. After a job, Taylor learns that the Undersiders have unwittingly assisted their patron, the gang lord known as Coil, in the kidnapping of Dinah, a girl with powerful precognitive powers, and is wracked with guilt over her involvement.

In part due to violence initiated by the defeat of various gangs by the Undersiders, Brockton Bay experiences a period of instability. This culminates in an attack by Leviathan, one of three powerful monsters collectively called the Endbringers, which devastates the city. In the aftermath, Coil directs the Undersiders and a group of contracted villains, the Travelers, in seizing territory and they begin to operate as makeshift warlords in the ruined city. Privately, Taylor and the Undersiders plot to depose Coil if they cannot secure Dinah's release. The Travelers struggle to find a cure for their fifth teammate, Noelle, whose condition is undisclosed and is living in a highly secure vault in Coil’s base. When Jack Slash, the theatrical leader of a notorious gang of parahuman serial killers known as the Slaughterhouse Nine, invades Brockton Bay, Dinah predicts he will bring about the end of the world in two years if not stopped. The city weathers the incursion, but its parahumans fail to kill either Jack or his prized protégé Bonesaw, a young girl kidnapped and moulded by the gang of serial killers. In the process of escaping the city, Jack learns of Dinah's prophecy and decides to fulfill it and end the world.

Coil, valuing Dinah's precognitive abilities too highly to consider her release, attempts to assassinate Taylor when she pushes the issue. She survives and the Undersiders kill Coil in retaliation. However, as a final act of vengeance, Coil unleashes Noelle (now called “Echidna”), who is revealed to be a monstrous parahuman with power and lethality on par with the Endbringers. The ensuing battle between Echidna and the desperate alliance comprising the Undersiders and the heroes devastates the already-ruined city even further, and lack of cohesion between the Undersiders and the heroes (such as the heroes ignoring the Undersiders' warnings that Echidna can clone parahumans) worsens the conflict as well. After Echidna is defeated, Dinah is later returned to her remaining family, and the Undersiders seize control of the remnants of Coil's criminal empire, fully entrenching themselves as the shadowy rulers of Brockton Bay, though it remains ostensibly governed by the United States. Together, Taylor and the Undersiders carefully balance staving off attempts by regional criminal organizations to establish footholds in their city with scuffles against the legal authority of the city and assisting the remaining civilian population.

Tensions with the authorities later come to a head when Protectorate heroes arrive at a school Taylor is visiting in an attempt to arrest her, publicly revealing her identity as Skitter in ensuing standoff. Taylor is even further dismayed when she is informed by the heroes that Dinah had turned on her and was voluntarily aiding them in their operation to capture her. Despite the overwhelming advantage that Dinah's abilities had given the heroes, Taylor leverages her reputation and the Protectorate's dwindling popularity to convince almost a hundred students to help her escape, and flees to the safety of her territory. The Undersiders then continue with their operations in Brockton Bay, later carrying out an attack against the PRT local headquarters in retaliation for outing Skitter and as a show of force to deter rival gangs from action.

Taylor later learns from Dinah that the odds of averting the end of the world would increase if she is taken by the authorities. In response, Taylor devises a daring plan to conditionally surrender to the PRT and Protectorate, in the hopes of gaining a position to force meaningful change in the declining organizations before Dinah's deadline, as well as sparing the rest of the Undersiders from continued persecution by the authorities. The plan nearly fails when Alexandria, one of the world's most powerful heroes and secretly the PRT's Chief Director, attempts to force Taylor into accepting less-than-favorable demands by executing Undersiders one by one until she submits, prompting Taylor to kill her and others in a blind rage. Taylor later tries to escape in the aftermath of her attack, but is pursued by Protectorate heroes and learns from them that Alexandria had tricked her into believing that she was killing her friends. Reluctantly, Taylor agrees to surrender when the heroes accept most of her terms. Alexandria is publicly framed as a villain whose death at Skitter's hand had been necessary, and Taylor becomes a new probationary superhero "Weaver."

After being tried and convicted as an adult, Taylor leaves Brockton Bay for the city of Chicago and is assigned to the local Wards, a team of teenage superheroes attached as a youth group to the Chicago Protectorate. Unsurprisingly, Weaver chafes under the restrictions imposed by her new superiors, with the Protectorate heroes and PRT officials naturally reticent and distrustful towards her (with some among the latter group even making veiled efforts to sabotage her), and with Weaver feeling less productive in comparison to when she was a supervillain. She also finds herself missing the Undersiders dearly, but is prohibited from having any contact with them due to the conditions of her probation, and fights the urge to return home due to the importance placed on adhering Dinah's predictions. Not long into Weaver's trial period with the Chicago Wards, Behemoth, another of the three Endbringers, surfaces and begins attacking New Delhi, India. The battle turns favorably for the capes and miraculously concludes in Behemoth's death. Weaver is instrumental in many capes surviving the conflict and Behemoth's demise, earning her popular renown and recognition as a genuine superhero, as well as cementing her place in the Wards.

Over the next two years, Taylor continues serving out her sentence with the Chicago Wards. When Dinah's deadline passes, Jack Slash resurfaces with an army of cloned members (and former members) of the Slaughterhouse Nine, forcing Weaver and her allies to go to war against Jack to prevent the apocalypse. Though they manage to hold off Jack and his army, Jack manages to reach Scion, the most powerful superhero of all, and convinces him to begin an apocalyptic, interdimensional rampage that would become known as "Gold Morning" - the prophesied end of the world. Billions are killed across the multiverse over the course of Gold Morning, with Scion overpowering the parahuman defenders with great ease. It is revealed that Scion is the avatar of an unfathomably powerful alien entity referred to as The Warrior, responsible for seeding the planet with superpowers in the first place, as part of his species' reproductive cycle; a cycle that would end in the destruction of the planet and all its alternate-dimension counterparts. One of the most powerful capes, Eidolon, is revealed to have unintentionally created the Endbringers before he is killed. The Undersiders convince the Endbringers to aid in the battle against Scion.

Taylor, in a desperate bid to defeat Scion, has her power surgically altered to control humans as well as insects, becoming “Khepri.” The plan succeeds, with Khepri gaining complete mental domination over the trans-dimensional array of parahuman defenders, coordinating the parahumans with great acuity and overwhelming the alien entity. Gold Morning ends with humanity victorious, but the surgery causes Taylor's power to consume her mind and render her insane, prompting her to flee from her allies and into the expanse of the multiverse before being accosted by Contessa, another powerful precognitive parahuman. Contessa is shown to be the final agent and architect of the interdimensional conspiracy known as Cauldron, suggested to be responsible for many of the previous events of the story with the aim of combating Scion. Contessa then shoots the ailing Taylor twice in the head, seemingly euthanizing the younger woman and neutralizing whatever threat Khepri would later pose. In a series of epilogues, the short-term fate of the remaining Undersiders and surviving heroes following Gold Morning is addressed.

Unbeknownst to all her remaining friends and former allies, Taylor survived and is living in exile alongside her father on Earth Aleph, an alternate dimension that had been sealed off from the rest of the multiverse upon Scion's defeat. Contessa's gunshots appears to have restored Taylor's sanity, but seemingly removed her powers as well. With her short and frenetic life as a cape having ended, Taylor intends to settle into a quiet existence with the anonymity afforded to her on Earth Aleph, and later encounters and befriends an alternate version of her late mother.

== Themes ==
Hal Wierzbicki of entertainment site C0ws observed that

If I had to identify a theme running through all of Worm, it’s Taylor wanting to make the world a better place, a safer place, for herself, her family and her friends. If I had to pick a second theme, it would be that those good intentions aren’t enough. Taylor seems to make the best decision at any possible moment, the decision that gets her out of a losing fight, the decision that saves the lives of her friends, the decision that wins a battle. Yet, in doing so, things just get worse.

Gavin Scott Williams suggested that the story contains an "undercurrent" of the idea that "sometimes you have to go outside the rules to do the right thing". Several authors have compared the story to Alan Moore's Watchmen, as well as the character of Spider-Man and his themes of responsibility, although McCrae has stated in interviews that no one author has heavily influenced him.

The title Worm has multiple potential meanings. It has been connected to the protagonist's character development, as a "lowly, overlooked" person who is nonetheless useful and dangerous; drawing a parallel with the protagonist's power to control worms and other bugs. The arc titles also generally have double meanings.

Several reviewers have described the serial as an exercise in repeatedly escalating the stakes of the story.

A number of reviewers have noted the characters' ingenuity, and the original and creative use of superpowers in the narrative. Author Adam Sherman described one of the recurring themes of the story as "that powers don’t really make the person, it's the person who makes the power". McCrae has described how he would regularly write himself into corners, so that "the desperate gambits we see are echoed by my writerly desperation to figure out a way to keep things going." G.S Williams drew a parallel between the protagonist's power being seemingly underwhelming, and her being overlooked in her civilian life, and the broader theme of things being overlooked.

== Reception ==
Worm has received almost entirely favorable reviews. It received substantial attention following a favorable review by author Gavin Scott Williams roughly six months into publication, who praised the story's themes and originality. Readership doubled when it was recommended by Eliezer Yudkowsky, author of Harry Potter and the Methods of Rationality, on his website while the story was in its final months.

Critics favorably compared it to the similar-length book series A Song of Ice and Fire. Matt Freeman of Doof Media praised the story's originality, noting that it works as a science fiction story to a degree not found in most works of superhero fiction. Media site Toolsandtoys.net published a review by Chris Gonzales, who described it as "one of my favorite stories ever written". However, he also noted that it was "dark", warning "definitely don’t hand this to a kid to read". Chris Ellis of Ergohacks.com noted that the story "managed to hit every single trigger warning we have listed", but called it "among the best books and universes I’ve ever read."

Reviewers have praised the story's realism and use of consequences, contrasting it favorably with the tendency for characters to miraculously return from the dead in superhero comic books and films. Many praised the story's originality and creative use of superpowers. Several reviewers commended the detail, consistency, and depth of the setting.

Several reviews praised the story as being highly addictive.

The story also possesses a sizable online fanbase. Fans of the story have collaborated to create a complete audio book, as well as other projects, such as the We've Got Worm podcast, a weekly arc-by-arc podcast with a first-time reader and a Worm expert. Fan art relating to the novel has been published on DeviantArt, as well as a large amount of fan fiction. There is an IRC chatroom established for readers to comment and discuss the story, which is constantly active, as well as communities of fans on a number of online forums. Worm, along with McCrae's other completed works Pact, Twig, and the Worm sequel Ward, are consistently among the highest-rated works on ratings site TopWebFiction, and Worm is the highest-rated work on several websites that collect serial fiction.

Several publications have discussed Worm within the context of the increasing popularity of web serials, and compared to the work of authors such as Charles Dickens and Mark Twain, who also wrote in the serial format. Authors Olivia Rising and Adam Sherman have credited it as a decisive influence on their work.

A number of companies have approached McCrae to discuss adapting Worm, as well as another of his serials, Twig. However, McCrae takes a pessimistic view of whether it will be successfully adapted.

The story received additional media attention in 2025, during investigations into the Zizians, following a spree of killings and arrests. The group's founder, Ziz LaSota, had named herself for the Simurgh, also known as Ziz, the Endbringer who turns people who spend time around her dangerously violent. Worm constitutes a common literary reference point in the rationalist community.

== Sequel ==
In October 2017, McCrae announced on his blog that a sequel to Worm would be released. The interim story arc, Glow-worm, was released beginning October 21, 2017, and the sequel, Ward, featuring a new protagonist, began serialization on November 11, 2017, and was concluded on May 2, 2020.
