= Peter Biar Ajak =

South Sudanese peace activist, scholar and former political prisoner

Peter Biar
- Born: November 23, 1983 (age 42); Bor, South Sudan
- Citizenship: South Sudanese
- Education: Harvard University, Cambridge University
- Occupation: Economist

Peter Biar Ajak (born November 21, 1983) is a South Sudanese peace activist, scholar, and former political prisoner who was arbitrarily detained in South Sudan from July 2018 to January 2020. Forced to flee a South Sudanese hit squad in July 2020, he now resides in the United States, where he continues to advocate for peace and democracy in South Sudan. While in the United States, he has served as a visiting fellow at the Africa Center for Strategic Studies and a Reagan-Fascell Democracy Fellow at the National Endowment for Democracy.

On March 5, 2024, Ajak was named in a U.S. Department of Justice complaint which charged him and an associate with three counts relating to illegal arms exportation to South Sudan through a third country. The complaint alleged that Ajak planned to use these arms to conduct a coup d'état to topple the government of South Sudan. Ajak pleaded guilty to conspiracy charges and was jailed in February 2026.

== Personal life and education ==
Peter Biar Ajak was born in the town of Bor in what is now South Sudan, in November 1983, six months after the Second Sudanese Civil War broke out. At the age of 6, he was forced to flee the country as one of over 100,000 in the Red Army of South Sudan. He sought refuge first in Ethiopia in 1989, then traveled back through Sudan to Kenya in 1992, where he stayed in a refugee camp for most of the decade. At age 16, he was one of roughly 4,000 "Lost Boys of Sudan" resettled as a refugee in the United States.

In the United States, Ajak excelled academically, graduating from Central High School (Philadelphia) in 2003 and earning a Bachelor of Arts degree in Economics from La Salle University in 2007. He then went on to earn a Master of Public Administration in International Development from the John F. Kennedy School of Government at Harvard University in 2009, where he was a Public Service Fellow. At the time of his arrest in July 2018, Ajak was working towards his PhD in Politics and International Studies at the University of Cambridge, Trinity College. He completed his PhD following his release in 2020, becoming the first South Sudanese national to hold a PhD from Cambridge.

On December 17, 2010, Ajak married Nyathon Hoth Mai. They have three children.

== Career and activism in South Sudan ==
Determined to help South Sudan develop and succeed, Ajak returned to his country after completing his degree at Harvard. He became the World Bank's In-Country Economist and advised the government on the economic development of the country, including by contributing to the South Sudan Development Plan, the South Sudan Growth Strategy, and South Sudan Vision 2040. Following South Sudan gaining independence on July 9, 2011, Ajak joined the Government as Senior Advisor to the Minister of National Security, serving as the Coordinator of Policy and Strategy in the Office of the Minister of National Security in the Office of the President of South Sudan. In this role, he contributed to the development of South Sudan White Paper on Intelligence and National Security, the South Sudan National Security Policy & Strategy, and the South Sudan National Security Act. Ajak also became the Co-Country Director, and later a Senior Advisor, for the International Growth Centre (IGC) – an economic policy institute based at the London School of Economics and University of Oxford. In January 2012, he founded the Center for Strategic Analyses and Research (C-SAR) – an independent policy think tank in Juba. Prior to his arrest, Ajak served as a political economy analyst for UNICEF from 2017 to 2018.

Ajak also focused professionally on engaging and creating opportunities for dialogue among South Sudanese youth. In September 2010, he founded and became the CEO of South Sudan Wrestling Entertainment, which organized wrestling tournaments throughout the country to bring young people together and celebrate the country's unique culture. Ajak also co-founded the South Sudan Young Leaders Forum (SSYLF) in January 2017 to bring together young leaders from across ethnic and political divides and encourage them to deliberate South Sudan's challenges through peaceful dialogue. One of the key initiatives of SSYLF was Generational Exit, which was a campaign to incentivize old leaders to step down and allow a younger generation of leaders to shape the country's future. Ajak additionally helped establish a national veterans' association called the Red Army Foundation.

In recognition of his work and achievement, he was named both an Atlantic Council's Millennium Fellow and a 2016 Archbishop Desmond Tutu Leadership Fellow. He also received the Crans Montana Forum's New Leader for Tomorrow Award from the former President of Mali, Moussa Traoré, at a ceremony in Brussels, Belgium.

Due to his expertise and strong beliefs, Ajak became a prominent political commentator. He regularly appeared on NTV Kenya to provide expert commentary on the situation in South Sudan and to speak about SSYLF. During some of his appearances, he openly criticized South Sudanese government and advocated for free and fair elections. He also posted similar political comments and material on his Facebook and Twitter pages. In an appearance in the weeks leading up to his arrest, he criticized President Salva Kiir and Riek Machar by name, spoke about Generational Exit, and called for the current South Sudanese leaders to step down. He reiterated these calls on social media.

== Arrest in South Sudan ==
On July 28, 2018, National Security Service (NSS) officials arrested Ajak at the Juba International Airport, where he was scheduled to fly to the town of Awiel for Martyrs' Day celebrations organized by the Red Army Foundation. He was not provided with a legitimate warrant or a written or verbal explanation for his arrest. Ajak was transported directly from the airport to the notorious Blue House prison, where NSS is headquartered, without being brought before a judge.

=== Detention ===
Ajak's arrest and detention reflected "a deeply troubling pattern of increasing government repression against its critics." The South Sudanese government had enacted policies restricting civic space and aggressively sought to silence dissenting voices, often through arbitrary detention. It seemed that Ajak was being targeted as a result of his civil society work and advocacy for human rights and political change. Several days into his detention, one of his lawyers was shown documents outlining an investigation into Ajak's activities, primarily centering on his political commentary and work with SSYLF. On August 15, 2018, his lawyers were informed he was being investigated on potential charges of treason and terrorism. The NSS presented them with an expanded list of possible charges in September.

In the Blue House, Ajak was subjected to various due process and human rights violations. He was not formally charged or brought before a court until March 2019, roughly eight months after his arrest. Prison authorities regularly denied visitation rights to Ajak's family and lawyers, the latter of whom were not permitted to meet with him until mid-September 2018. He was also repeatedly denied his right to the presumption of bail. He was subjected to prolonged solitary confinement and inhuman conditions, including restricted food and little to no access to medical care even when he was ill.

In October 2018, a number of detainees staged an armed protest against the rights violations occurring in the Blue House. Ajak did not participate in the protest; instead, he urged the participants to lay down their arms. On October 7, 2018, while the protest was ongoing, he gave a brief telephone interview with Voice of America in which he discussed the protest and provided basic and publicly known facts about the due process violations occurring in the Blue House. The protests ended when the prisoners voluntarily surrendered their weapons, which Ajak helped negotiate.

For nearly four months following the protest, Ajak was cut off entirely from the outside world. He was denied access to his family and lawyers from the time of the protests in early October until late January 2019.

=== Trial and conviction ===
Ajak's first court appearance was on March 21, 2019, during which he was denied bail by the High Court. He then appeared for a hearing on March 25, 2019, at which point he was issued preliminary charges that lacked any reference to the initial investigation against him and instead focused entirely on the October protest. On April 26, 2019, four of the five charges were dropped after the state failed to produce evidence or witnesses to support that he had been involved in planning or carrying out the protest. The charge of "Acts Committed by Several Persons in Furtherance of Common Intention" was kept and a charge of "Participating in Gathering with Intent to Promote Public Violence, Breaches of the Peace or Bigotry" was added. The judge made clear that these two charges were a result of his interview with Voice of America, which he claimed "created fear and insecurity in the public." Ajak's renewed request for bail was denied and reports arose of NSS intimidation of witnesses and the defense lawyers.

On June 11, 2019, he was convicted and sentenced to two years in prison. After his conviction, he was transferred from the Blue House to Juba Central Prison, which offered relatively better conditions.

=== International support ===
Ajak's arrest and detention inspired an international outcry. In the days following his arrest, various international institutions, human rights groups, and foreign governments concerned about democracy and the rule of law condemned the actions of the South Sudanese government and demanded his release. This support continued throughout his detention. His case was included in human rights reports by Human Rights Watch, the United Nations Secretary-General, Amnesty International, the United States Department of State, and the United Nations Panel of Experts on South Sudan. His case was brought to the floor of the United States Congress, British Parliament, and the European Parliament.

On August 1, 2018, U.S. Senators Cory Booker (D-NJ) and Chris Coons (D-DE), both members of the Senate Foreign Relations Committee, issued a joint statement, saying "We are deeply concerned about the reported detention of South Sudanese peace activist Peter Biar Ajak by South Sudan's National Security Service after his criticism of the direction of the South Sudanese peace process."

In late January 2019, international human rights lawyer Jared Genser announced that he had joined Ajak's legal team and had filed an urgent action appeal on his behalf with the United Nations Special Rapporteurs on the Situation of Human Rights Defenders and on Freedom of Opinion and Expression.

On February 6, 2019, Representative Madeleine Dean (D-PA), who had taught at La Salle when Ajak was a student, made a speech on the floor of the U.S. House of Representatives calling for his release.

On March 6, 2019, a group of United Nations experts released a statement urging the South Sudanese government to release him immediately and highlighting the widespread and illegal use of broad national security and counter-terrorism legislation to repress free speech and legitimate human rights work.

On June 12, 2019, Genser filed a petition to the United Nations Working Group on Arbitrary Detention requesting that the body investigate Ajak's ongoing detention and conclude he was being held in violation of international law.

=== Pardon ===
On January 2, 2020, the South Sudanese government announced through a presidential decree run on state media that Ajak was among dozens of prisoners being pardoned. He was released from prison on January 4, 2020. Following his release, he left South Sudan to visit his wife and children in Nairobi, and to undergo a thorough medical check-up.

=== Escape to the United States ===
In early-to-mid June 2020, Ajak received word from senior government officials in South Sudan that President Salva Kiir had ordered the NSS to either abduct him from Kenya or murder him. The South Sudanese government had used this tactic before, namely in 2017 when two dissidents, Dong Samuel Luak and Aggrey Iddris, were abducted from Nairobi and seemingly executed. He and his family were forced to go into hiding for several weeks until the United States government granted them emergency visas. They fled the country and arrived safely in Washington, D.C., on July 23, 2020.

== Arrest in United States ==
On March 5, 2024, Ajak was named in a U.S. Department of Justice complaint which charged him and an associate with three counts relating to illegal arms exportation to South Sudan through a third country. The complaint alleged that Ajak planned to use these arms to conduct a coup d'état to topple the government of South Sudan.

In June 2025, Jane Street Capital co-founder Robert Granieri claimed he was duped into funding the alleged coup plot, helping Ajak purchase Stinger missiles, AK-47s, and grenades, among other weapons. Ajak initially pleaded not guilty.

In February 2026, Ajak and his co-defendant Abraham Chol Keech pleaded guilty to conspiracy to violate U.S. weapons export laws. Ajak was sentenced to 46 months in prison, and Keech to 41 months.

Out of the 46 months, the court put into consideration the 24 months already served and hence 22 months left for his release where he will be under watch for an additional 36 months. Therefore, Ajak is likely to be out of prison in the summer of 2027 to reunite with his family.

== Publications ==
Ajak has written extensively on the situation in South Sudan. In January 2013, he co-wrote an article for SSRN Electronic Journal entitled "South Sudan's Capability Trap: Building a State with Disruptive Innovation." In 2015 he published an article with the International Peace Institute entitled "State Formation, Humanitarianism, and Institutional Capabilities in South Sudan." In January 2016, he was among co-authors who contributed to the book Considering the State: Perspectives on South Sudan's Subdivision and Federalism Debate.

His doctoral thesis at University of Cambridge is "Building on Sand: The Sudan People's Liberation Movement Army and State Formation in South Sudan".
