= Robert Granieri =

American financier

- Born: April 6, 1972 (age 54); Norristown, Pennsylvania, U.S.
- Education: University of Pennsylvania
- Occupation: Financier
- Known for: Co-founder of trading firm Jane Street Capital

Robert Anthony Granieri (born April 6, 1972) is an American billionaire financier, philanthropist, and co-founder of Jane Street Capital.

== Early life and education ==
Granieri was raised near Norristown, Pennsylvania, where his family operated the banquet hall Chateau Granieri. After attending Methacton High School, he earned a bachelor's degree from the University of Pennsylvania in 1992.

== Career ==
He began his trading career at Susquehanna International Group, leaving in 1999 to launch Jane Street with colleagues Michael Jenkins, Timothy Reynolds, and Marc Gerstein. The new firm was subsequently sued by Susquehanna for allegedly poaching employees in breach of non-compete agreements; the case later became dormant. Over time, the other co-founders departed the firm. Tim Reynolds left in 2012 to establish art schools and private resorts, while Mike Jenkins became known for his political donations in New York City and for owning a pet pot-bellied pig. Jane Street grew into a leading electronic liquidity provider, accounting for roughly one-quarter of U.S. ETF volume by 2024. The firm is structured as a partnership without formal titles.

In 2024, Jane Street filed suit against two former employees for allegedly misappropriating proprietary strategies, a case that precipitated an investigation by the Securities and Exchange Board of India into options-market manipulation allegations and later banned the firm. Separately, Granieri was an unwitting donor to a failed plot to overthrow the South Sudanese government; U.S. prosecutors later secured guilty pleas from the organizers.

Outside finance, Granieri financed the Scarlet Pearl Casino casino resort in D'Iberville, Mississippi, and is known for supporting effective-altruism causes, criminal-justice reform, psychedelic research, and evacuation efforts during the 2021 Taliban takeover of Afghanistan. Donations are frequently made anonymously.

== Controversies ==
=== Hiring of Sam Bankman-Fried ===
Granieri personally recruited now convicted fraudster Sam Bankman-Fried to Jane Street, effectively giving him his start in finance in 2013.. The Financial Times said "Having Jane Street on the CV was a crucial bit of Bankman-Fried’s sales pitch."

=== 2024 South Sudan coup involvement ===
Granieri claims he was "duped" into funding $7 million into an alleged coup plot of South Sudan in 2024. Granieri's name was first revealed as connected to the plot in the federal indictment of Peter Ajak and Abraham Keech for conspiring to illegally export arms to their home country. Granieri's backing allowed the men to purchase Stinger missiles, grenade launchers, machine guns, and more than 3.5 millions rounds of ammunition. In 2024, the two men were sentenced to 3.5 years in prison.

=== Campaign contributions ===
Since 2012, Granieri has made almost 500 campaign donations directly to candidate political action committees. Since 2023, Granieri has donated more than $5 million to Super PACs in US elections, most to pro-Israel groups such as United Democracy Project, the Super PAC affiliated with AIPAC. In the 2026 cycle, the Sludge Report and The American Prospect reported a $600,000 contribution in one day just in North Carolina's 4th congressional district alone.
