= Rationalist community =

Internet community

Logo of LessWrong

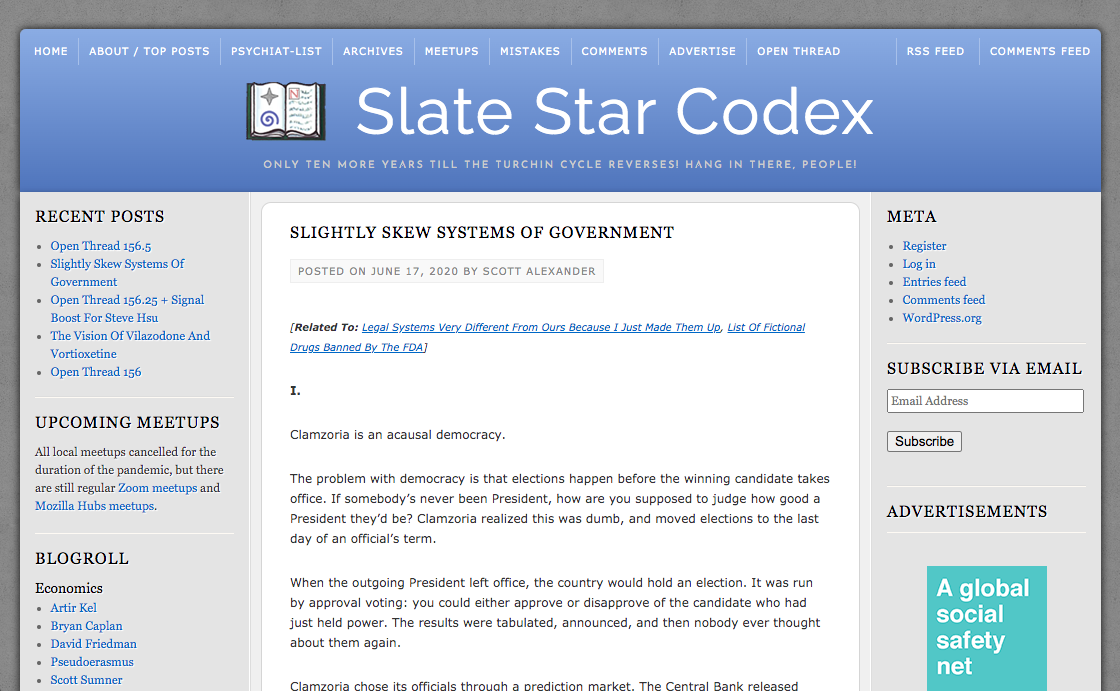
Slate Star Codex in 2020

The rationalist community is a 21st-century movement that formed around a group of internet blogs, primarily LessWrong and Astral Codex Ten (formerly known as Slate Star Codex). The movement initially gained prominence in the San Francisco Bay Area. Its members seek to use insights from various academic fields (such as epistemology, probability theory, and psychology) and awareness of cognitive biases to achieve both epistemic rationality (coming to true beliefs about the world) and instrumental rationality (acting in a way to achieve one's objectives). Heavily overlapping communities include effective altruism, transhumanism, and AI safety (specifically mitigation of AI extinction risk).

The borders of the rationalist community are blurry and subject to debate among the community and adjacent groups. Members who diverge from typical rationalist beliefs often self-describe as "rationalist-adjacent" or "post-rationalist" (also known as "ingroup" and "TPOT", an acronym for "this part of Twitter").

== Description ==
=== Rationality ===
Rationalists define rationality to include epistemic rationality (coming to true beliefs about the world) and instrumental rationality (acting in a way to achieve one's objectives).

The rationalists are concerned with applying science and probability to various topics, with special attention to Bayesian inference. According to Ellen Huet, the rationalist community "aim[s] to keep their thinking unbiased, even when the conclusions are scary".

The early rationalist blogs LessWrong and Slate Star Codex attracted a STEM-interested audience that cared about self-improvement, and was suspicious of the academic humanities and how emotions inhibit rational thinking. However, rationalists rejected the Spock-style archetype of emotionlessness, with LessWrong-founder Eliezer Yudkowsky arguing that emotions can themselves be instrumentally rational responses to situations. The movement attracted the attention of the founder culture of Silicon Valley, leading to many shared cultural shibboleths and obsessions, especially optimism about the ability of intelligent capitalists and technocrats to create widespread prosperity.

Writing for The New Atlantis, Tara Isabella Burton describes rationalist culture as having a "technocratic focus on ameliorating the human condition through hyper-utilitarian goals", with the "distinctly liberal optimism... that defines so much of Silicon Valley ideology — that intelligent people, using the right epistemic tools, can think better, and save the world by doing so". Burton writes that "Central to the rationalist worldview was the idea that nothing — not social niceties, not fear of political incorrectness, certainly not unwarranted emotion — could, or should, get between human beings and their ability to apprehend the world as it really is".

=== AI safety ===
One of the main interests of the rationalist community is combating existential risk posed by the emergence of an artificial superintelligence. Many members of the rationalist community believe that it is one of the only communities that has a chance at saving humanity from extinction. The stress associated with this consequential responsibility has been a contributing factor to mental health crises among several rationalists.

=== Other beliefs ===
Bloomberg Businessweek journalist Ellen Huet adds that the rationalist movement "valorizes extremes: seeking rational truth above all else, donating the most money and doing the utmost good for the most important reason. This way of thinking can lend an attractive clarity, but it can also provide cover for destructive or despicable behavior".

Writing in The New Yorker, Gideon Lewis-Kraus argues that rationalists "have given safe harbor to some genuinely egregious ideas," such as scientific racism and neoreactionary views, and that "the rationalists' general willingness to pursue orderly exchanges on objectionable topics, often with monstrous people, remains not only a point of pride but a constitutive part of the subculture's self-understanding." Though this attitude is based on "the view that vile ideas should be countenanced and refuted rather than left to accrue the status of forbidden knowledge", rationalists also hold the view that other ideas, referred to as information hazards, are dangerous and should be suppressed. Roko's basilisk and the writings of Ziz LaSota are commonly cited information hazards among rationalists.

Some members and former members of the community have said that aspects of the community can be cult-like. In The New York Times, religious scholar Greg Epstein stated: "When you think about the billions at stake and the radical transformation of lives across the world because of the eccentric vision of this group, how much more cult-y does it have to be for this to be a cult? Not much."

=== Lifestyle ===
While the movement has online origins, the community is also active and close-knit offline. The community is especially active in the San Francisco Bay Area, where many rationalists live in intentional communities and some engage in polyamorous relationships with other rationalists.

== History ==
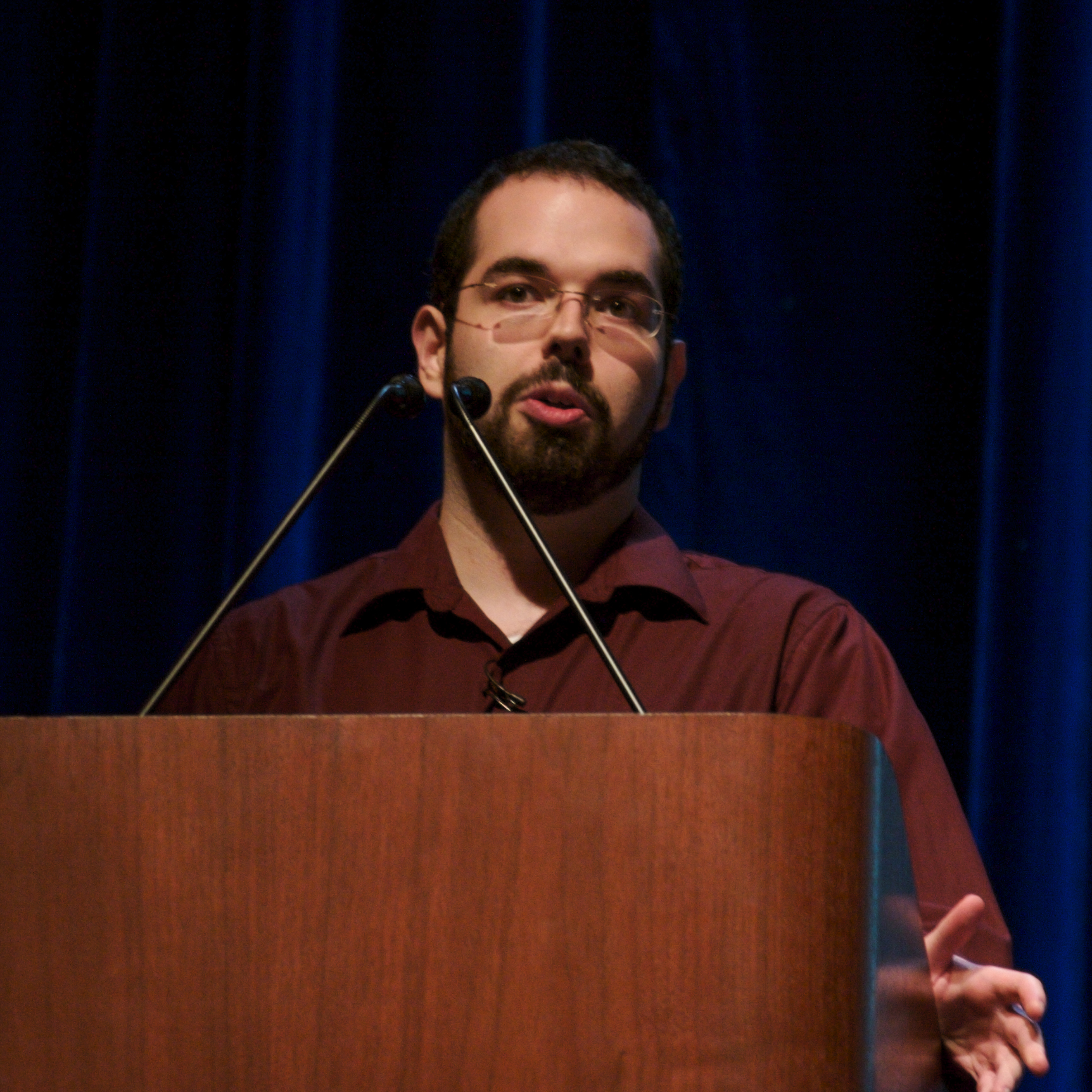
Eliezer Yudkowsky in 2006

LessWrong was originally founded in 2009, although the community had previously existed on various blogs on the Internet, including Overcoming Bias (founded in 2006). Slate Star Codex was launched in 2013, and its successor blog Astral Codex Ten was launched on January 21, 2021.

Eliezer Yudkowsky created LessWrong and is regarded as a major figure within the movement. He expressed many of his views in a series of blog posts written between 2006 and 2009 called the Sequences, and collected in ebook format as a series of books known as Rationality: from AI to Zombies. He has also published the Harry Potter fanfiction called Harry Potter and the Methods of Rationality from 2010 to 2015, which led people towards LessWrong and the rationalist community. Harry Potter and the Methods of Rationality was a highly popular fanfiction and is well-regarded within the rationalist community. Yudkowsky has used the work to solicit donations for the Center for Applied Rationality, which teaches courses based on it, and a 2013 LessWrong survey revealed a quarter of its users had found the site due to the fanfiction.

In the 2010s, the rationalist community emerged as a major force in Silicon Valley. Silicon Valley founders such as Elon Musk, Peter Thiel, Vitalik Buterin, Dustin Moskovitz, and Jaan Tallinn have donated to rationalist-associated institutions or otherwise supported rationalist figures. The movement has directed hundreds of millions of dollars towards companies, research labs, and think tanks aligned with its objectives, and was influential in the abortive removal of Sam Altman from OpenAI.

Bay Area organizations associated with the rationalist community include the Center for Applied Rationality, which teaches the techniques of rationality espoused by rationalists, and the Machine Intelligence Research Institute, which conducts research on AI safety.

== Overlapping movements and offshoots ==
The borders of the rationalist community are blurry and subject to debate among the community and adjacent groups. The rationalist community has a large overlap with effective altruism and transhumanism. Critics such as computer scientist Timnit Gebru and philosopher Émile P. Torres link rationalists with other philosophies they collectively name TESCREAL: Transhumanism, extropianism, singularitarianism, cosmism, rationalism, effective altruism, and longtermism. Members who diverge from typical rationalist beliefs often self-describe as "rationalist-adjacent", "post-rationalist" (also known as "ingroup" and "TPOT", an acronym for "this part of Twitter") or "EA-adjacent".

=== Effective altruism ===
Effective altruism (EA) is a 21st-century philosophical and social movement that advocates impartially calculating benefits and prioritizing causes to provide the greatest good. Proponents describe the movement as "using evidence and reason to figure out how to benefit others as much as possible, and taking action on that basis". People who pursue the goals of effective altruism, who are sometimes called effective altruists, (Note: The term effective altruists is used to refer to people who embrace effective altruism in many published sources such as Oliver (2014), Singer (2015), and MacAskill (2017), though as Pummer & MacAskill (2020) noted, calling people "effective altruists" minimally means that they are engaged in the project of "using evidence and reason to try to find out how to do the most good, and on this basis trying to do the most good", not that they are perfectly effective nor even that they necessarily participate in the effective altruism community.) follow a variety of approaches proposed by the movement, such as donating to selected charities and choosing careers, with the goal of maximising positive impact. The movement has spurred the creation of research centers, advisory organizations, and charities, which collectively have donated several hundred million dollars.

A defining feature of effective altruism is impartiality, specifically the global equal consideration of interests when choosing beneficiaries. Popular cause priorities within effective altruism include global health and development, social and economic inequality, animal welfare, and risks to the survival or flourishing of humanity over the long-term future. Only a small portion of all charities are affiliated with effective altruism, except in niche areas such as farmed-animal welfare, AI safety, and biosecurity.

The movement developed during the 2000s, and the name effective altruism was coined in 2011. Philosophers influential to the movement include Peter Singer, Toby Ord, and William MacAskill. Effective altruism is most popular within the Anglosphere, with concentrations at elite universities in the United States and United Kingdom, as well as in and around the technology industry in the San Francisco Bay Area.

Some have argued that effective altruism focuses on incremental interventions instead of systemic or political interventions. The movement received mainstream attention and criticism with the bankruptcy of the cryptocurrency exchange FTX in 2022 as founder Sam Bankman-Fried was a major funder of effective altruism. Some women in the San Francisco Bay Area criticized what they described as a culture of sexual misconduct occurring among some participants in the movement. Proponents of the term TESCREAL argue that effective altruism is part of an overlapping bundle of movements.

=== Postrationalists ===
The postrationalists are a loose group of one-time rationalists who became disillusioned with the rationalist community, which they came to perceive as cult-like and dogmatic and as having lost focus on the less quantifiable elements of a well-lived human life. This community also goes by the acronym TPOT, standing for This Part of Twitter. The term postrationalist is also used as a hedge by people associated with the rationalist community who have drifted from its orthodoxy.

=== Zizians ===
The Zizians are a splinter group with an ideological emphasis on veganism and anarchism, which became well known in 2025 for being suspected of involvement in four murders. The Zizians originally formed around the Bay Area rationalist community, but became disillusioned with other rationalist organizations and leaders. Among the Zizians' accusations against them were anti-transgender discrimination, misuse of donor funds to pay off a sexual misconduct accuser, and not valuing animal welfare in plans for human-friendly AI.

The group has been called a cult or cult-like by publications such as The Independent, the Associated Press, SFGate, and Reason. The Boston Globe and The New York Times have compared the Zizians to the Manson Family. Similarly, Anna Salamon, the director of the Center for Applied Rationality, compared the Zizian belief system to that of a doomsday cult.

== See also ==
- Effective accelerationism
- New Atheism
- The Californian Ideology

== Sources ==
- Burton, Tara Isabella (2023). "Rational Magic". The New Atlantis.
- Huet, Ellen (2023-03-07). "The Real-Life Consequences of Silicon Valley's AI Obsession". Bloomberg Businessweek. Archived from the original on 2023-03-08.
- Chivers (13 June 2019). The Rationalist's Guide to the Galaxy: Superintelligent AI and the Geeks Who Are Trying to Save Humanity's Future. Orion. ISBN 9781474608800. Archived from the original on 18 May 2023.
- Frank, Sam (January 2015). "Come With Us If You Want to Live". Harper's Magazine. Archived from the original on 2026-02-15.
- Metz, Cade (2025-08-04). "The Rise of Silicon Valley's Techno-Religion". The New York Times. Archived from the original on 2025-08-04.
- Metz, Cade (2021-02-13). "Silicon Valley's Safe Space". The New York Times. ISSN 0362-4331. Archived from the original on 2021-04-20.
- Barba, Michael; Cassidy, Megan; Gafni, Matthias (2025-05-16). "Before killings linked to cultlike 'Zizians,' a string of psychiatric crises befell AI doomsdayers". San Francisco Chronicle. Archived from the original on 2025-05-23.
- Shugerman, Emily (2024-12-10). "This one internet subculture explains murder suspect Luigi Mangione's odd politics". The San Francisco Standard. "former adherents who became 'disillusioned with that whole scene, because it's a little culty, it's a little dogmatic'"
- Ratliff, Evan (February 21, 2025). "The Delirious, Violent, Impossible True Story of the Zizians". Wired. Archived from the original on February 26, 2025.
