= List of transhumanists =

Following is a list of transhumanists.

== A ==
- Steve Aoki
- Henri Atlan
- Jacques Attali

== B ==
- Ronald Bailey
- William Sims Bainbridge
- Hal V. Barron
- Greg Bear
- Alim Louis Benabid
- Russell Blackford
- Nick Bostrom
- Marshall Brain
- David Brin
- Damien Broderick
- Vitalik Buterin

== C ==
- Riccardo Campa
- Tim Cannon
- Jamais Cascio
- Pierre Teilhard de Chardin
- George M. Church
- José Luis Cordeiro
- Brian Cox (physicist)
- Lee Daniel Crocker
- Antonei Csoka

== D ==
- Jeff Dee
- Manel De Aguas
- K. Eric Drexler
- George Dvorsky

== E ==
- Alexandra Elbakyan
- Warren Ellis
- Jeffrey Epstein
- Robert Ettinger

== F ==
- Luc Ferry
- Hal Finney (computer scientist)
- FM-2030
- Robert Freitas
- Jacque Fresco
- Patri Friedman
- Steve Fuller (sociologist)
- Nikolai Fyodorovich Fyodorov

== G ==
- Hugo de Garis
- Joel Garreau
- Linda MacDonald Glenn
- David Gobel
- Ben Goertzel
- Aubrey de Grey
- CGP Grey

== H ==
- Yuval Noah Harari
- Brian Hanley (microbiologist)
- Robin Hanson
- Donna Haraway
- Neil Harbisson
- Stephen Hawking
- Keith Henson
- Danny Hillis
- James Hughes (sociologist)

== I ==
- Zoltan Istvan
- Dmitry Itskov

== J ==
- Bryan Johnson (entrepreneur)

== K ==
- Dean Kamen
- Michio Kaku
- Maria Konovalenko
- Randal A. Koene
- Ray Kurzweil
- Marios Kyriazis

== L ==
- Jaron Lanier
- Anthony Levandowski
- Arthur D. Levinson
- Newton Lee

== M ==
- Ken MacLeod
- Steve Mann
- Andy Miah
- Marvin Minsky
- Hans Moravec
- Max More

== N ==
- Ramez Naam
- Yuri Nikitin (author)

== P ==
- Liz Parrish
- David Pearce (philosopher)
- Hank Pellissier
- Charles Platt (author)
- Giulio Prisco
- Barry Ptolemy

== R ==
- Moon Ribas
- Glenn Reynolds
- Gabriel Rothblatt
- Martine Rothblatt

== S ==
- Anders Sandberg
- Jason Silva
- R. U. Sirius
- Victor Skumin
- Stefan Lorenz Sorgner
- Peter Sloterdijk
- Khannea Suntzu
- Stelarc
- Bruce Sterling
- Gregory Stock
- Gennady Stolyarov II
- Charles Stross
- Masayoshi Son

== T ==
- Jaan Tallinn
- Astro Teller
- Peter Thiel
- Alvin Toffler
- Aaron Traywick

== U ==
- Tim Urban (author)
- Josh Universe

== V ==
- Giuseppe Vatinno
- Vernor Vinge
- Natasha Vita-More

== W ==
- Mark Alan Walker
- Elaine_Walker_(composer)
- Kevin Warwick
- Ben Westbrook
- Stephen Wolfram
- David Wood (futurist)
- Naomi Wu

== Y ==
- Eliezer Yudkowsky

== See also ==
- Humanism
- List of humanists
