= Transhumanist politics =

Political ideologies based on Transhumanism

Transhumanist politics constitutes a group of political ideologies that generally express the belief in improving human individuals through science and technology. Specific topics include space migration, and cryogenic suspension. It is considered the opposing ideal to the concept of bioconservatism, as transhumanist politics argue for the use of all technology to enhance human individuals.

== History ==
The term "transhumanism" with its present meaning was popularised by Julian Huxley's 1957 essay of that name, at a time when his open endorsement of eugenics became socially controversial.

Natasha Vita-More was elected as a Councilperson for the 28th Senatorial District of Los Angeles in 1992. She ran with the Green Party, but on a personal platform of "transhumanism". She quit after a year, saying her party was "too neurotically geared toward environmentalism".

James Hughes identifies the "neoliberal" Extropy Institute, founded by philosopher Max More and developed in the 1990s, as the first organized advocates for transhumanism. And he identifies the late-1990s formation of the World Transhumanist Association (WTA), a European organization which later was renamed to Humanity+ (H+), as partly a reaction to the free market perspective of the "Extropians". Per Hughes, "[t]he WTA included both social democrats and neoliberals around a liberal democratic definition of transhumanism, codified in the Transhumanist Declaration." Hughes has also detailed the political currents in transhumanism, particularly the shift around 2009 from socialist transhumanism to libertarian and anarcho-capitalist transhumanism. He claims that the left was pushed out of the World Transhumanist Association Board of Directors, and that libertarians and Singularitarians have secured a hegemony in the transhumanism community with help from Peter Thiel, but Hughes remains optimistic about a techno-progressive future.

In 2012, the Longevity Party, a movement described as "100% transhumanist" by cofounder Maria Konovalenko, began to organize in Russia for building a balloted political party. Another Russian programme, the 2045 Initiative, was founded in 2012 by billionaire Dmitry Itskov with its own proposed "Evolution 2045" political party advocating life extension and android avatars.

In October 2013, the political party Alianza Futurista ALFA was founded in Spain with transhumanist goals and ideals inscribed in its statutes.

In October 2014, Zoltan Istvan announced that he would be running in the 2016 United States presidential election under the banner of the "Transhumanist Party." By November 2019, the Party claimed 880 members, with Gennady Stolyarov II as chair.

In 2016, Klaus Schwab, in his book The Fourth Industrial Revolution, asserted that transhumanist technologies like gene editing such as CRISPR and others will inevitably merge human physical, digital, and biological domains, presenting this transformation as an unstoppable driver of human progress in a new political and societal era.

In 2016, Yuval Noah Harari's book Homo Deus: A Brief History of Tomorrow popularized transhumanist ideas, envisioning a future where biotechnology, genetic engineering, and artificial intelligence enable humans to transcend biological limits, potentially creating "superhumans" with enhanced cognitive, physical, and emotional capacities. In 2018, Yuval Noah Harari, in works like 21 Lessons for the 21st Century and public talks, called humans “hackable animals,” asserting that AI and biotechnology will inevitably enable entities to manipulate human behavior and cognition, presenting a transhumanist future as both unavoidable and politically transformative.

Other groups using the name "Transhumanist Party" exist in the United Kingdom and Germany.

== Core values ==
According to a 2006 study by the European Parliament, transhumanism is the political expression of the ideology that technology and science should be used to enhance human abilities and characteristics like physical beauty, or lifespan.

According to Amon Twyman of the Institute for Ethics and Emerging Technologies (IEET), political philosophies which support transhumanism include social futurism, techno-progressivism, techno-libertarianism, and anarcho-transhumanism. Twyman considers such philosophies to collectively constitute political transhumanism.

Techno-progressives, also known as Democratic transhumanists, support equal access to human enhancement technologies in order to promote social equality and prevent technologies from furthering the divide among socioeconomic classes. However, libertarian transhumanist Ronald Bailey is critical of the democratic transhumanism described by James Hughes. Jeffrey Bishop wrote that the disagreements among transhumanists regarding individual and community rights is "precisely the tension that philosophical liberalism historically tried to negotiate," but that disagreeing entirely with a posthuman future is a disagreement with the right to choose what humanity will become. Woody Evans has supported placing posthuman rights in a continuum with animal rights and human rights.

Riccardo Campa wrote that transhumanism can be coupled with many different political, philosophical, and religious views, and that this diversity can be an asset so long as transhumanists do not give priority to existing affiliations over membership with organized transhumanism. Truman Chen of the Stanford Political Journal considers many transhumanist ideals to be anti-political.

== Anarcho-transhumanism ==
Flag of anarcho-transhumanism, represented by a blue and black diagonal flag, where the blue is representative of futuristic symbolism

Anarcho-transhumanism is an anti-capitalist ideology synthesizing anarchism with transhumanism that is concerned with both social and physical freedom respectively. Indeed, according to the anarcho-transhumanist activist William Gillis : "We should seek to expand our physical freedom just as we seek to expand our social freedom." Also, anarcho-transhumanists define freedom as the expansion of one's own ability to experience the world around them. Anarcho-transhumanists may advocate various praxis to advance their ideals, including computer hacking, three-dimensional printing, or biohacking.

The philosophy draws heavily from the individualist anarchism of William Godwin, Max Stirner and Voltairine de Cleyre. Anarcho-transhumanist thought looks at issues surrounding bodily autonomy, disability, gender, neurodiversity, queer theory, science, free software, and sexuality whilst presenting critiques through anarchist and transhumanist lens of ableism, cisheteropatriarchy and primitivism. Much of early anarcho-transhumanist thought was a response to anarcho-primitivism. Anarcho-transhumanism may be interpreted either as criticism of, or an extension of humanism, because it challenges what being human means.

Anarcho-transhumanists also criticise non-anarchist forms of transhumanism such as democratic transhumanism and libertarian transhumanism as incoherent and unsurvivable due to their preservation of the state. They view such instruments of power as inherently unethical and incompatible with the acceleration of social and material freedom for all individuals. Anarcho-transhumanism is generally anti-capitalist, arguing capitalist accumulation of wealth would lead to dystopia while partnered with transhumanism, instead advocating for equal access to advanced technologies that enable morphological freedom and space travel.

Anarcho-transhumanist philosopher William Gillis has advocated for a 'social singularity', or a transformation in humanity's morals, to complement the technological singularity. This social singularity will ensure that no coercion will be required to maintain order in a future society where people are likely to have access to lethal forms of technology.

== Democratic transhumanism ==
Democratic transhumanism, a term coined by James Hughes in 2002, refers to the stance of transhumanists (advocates for the development and use of human enhancement technologies) who espouse liberal, social, or radical democratic political views.

=== Philosophy ===
According to Hughes, the ideology "stems from the assertion that human beings will generally be happier when they take rational control of the natural and social forces that control their lives." The ethical foundation of democratic transhumanism rests upon rule utilitarianism and non-anthropocentric personhood theory. Democratic transhumanists support equal access to human enhancement technologies in order to promote social equality and to prevent technologies from furthering the divide among the socioeconomic classes. While raising objections both to right-wing and left-wing bioconservatism, and libertarian transhumanism, Hughes aims to encourage democratic transhumanists and their potential progressive allies to unite as a new social movement and influence biopolitical public policy.

An attempt to expand the middle ground between technorealism and techno-utopianism, democratic transhumanism can be seen as a radical form of techno-progressivism. Appearing several times in Hughes' work, the term "radical" (from Latin rādīx, rādīc-, root) is used as an adjective meaning of or pertaining to the root or going to the root. His central thesis is that emerging technologies and radical democracy can help citizens overcome some of the root causes of inequalities of power.

According to Hughes, the terms techno-progressivism and democratic transhumanism both refer to the same set of Enlightenment values and principles; however, the term technoprogressive has replaced the use of the word democratic transhumanism.

=== Trends ===
Hughes has identified 15 "left futurist" or "left techno-utopian" trends and projects that could be incorporated into democratic transhumanism:

- Afrofuturism
- Assistive technology-enabled disabled people
- Biopunk science fiction and movement
- Body modification culture
- Cyborg feminism/cyberfeminism
- Feminist science fiction
- Free software movement
- Lesbian science fiction, gay science fiction, bisexual science fiction and transgender science fiction
- Nanosocialism
- Post-Darwinian leftism
- Postcyberpunk science fiction
- Post-work/guaranteed minimum income movement
- Technogaianism
- Up-wing politics
- Viridian design movement

=== List of democratic transhumanists ===
These are notable individuals who have identified themselves, or have been identified by Hughes, as advocates of democratic transhumanism:

- Charles Stross
- George Dvorsky
- Giulio Prisco
- Ken MacLeod
- Mark Alan Walker
- Martine Rothblatt
- Ramez Naam
- Riccardo Campa

=== Criticism ===
Science journalist Ronald Bailey wrote a review of Citizen Cyborg in his online column for Reason magazine in which he offered a critique of democratic transhumanism and a defense of libertarian transhumanism.

Critical theorist Dale Carrico defended democratic transhumanism from Bailey's criticism. However, he would later criticize democratic transhumanism himself on technoprogressive grounds.

== Libertarian transhumanism ==
Libertarian transhumanism is a political ideology synthesizing libertarianism and transhumanism.

Self-identified libertarian transhumanists, such as Ronald Bailey of Reason magazine and Glenn Reynolds of Instapundit, are advocates of the asserted "right to human enhancement" who argue that the free market is the best guarantor of this right, claiming that it produces greater prosperity and personal freedom than other economic systems.

=== Principles ===
Libertarian transhumanists believe that the principle of self-ownership is the most fundamental idea from which both libertarianism and transhumanism stem. They are rational egoists and ethical egoists who embrace the prospect of using emerging technologies to enhance human capacities, which they believe stems from the self-interested application of reason and will in the context of the individual freedom to achieve a posthuman state of complete physical, mental, and social well-being and not merely the absence of disease or infirmity. They extend this rational and ethical egoism to advocate a form of "biolibertarianism".

As strong civil libertarians, libertarian transhumanists hold that any attempt to limit or suppress the asserted right to human enhancement is a violation of civil rights and civil liberties. However, as strong economic libertarians, they also reject proposed public policies of government-regulated and -insured human enhancement technologies, which are advocated by democratic transhumanists, because they fear that any state intervention will steer or limit their choices.

Extropianism, the earliest current of transhumanist thought defined in 1988 by philosopher Max More, initially included an anarcho-capitalist interpretation of the concept of "spontaneous order" in its principles, which states that a free market economy achieves a more efficient allocation of societal resources than any planned or mixed economy could achieve. In 2000, while revising the principles of Extropy, More seemed to be abandoning libertarianism in favor of modern liberalism and anticipatory democracy. However, many Extropians remained libertarian transhumanists.

=== Criticisms ===
Critiques of the techno-utopianism of libertarian transhumanists from progressive cultural critics include Richard Barbrook and Andy Cameron's 1995 essay The Californian Ideology; Mark Dery's 1996 book Escape Velocity: Cyberculture at the End of the Century; and Paulina Borsook's 2000 book Cyberselfish: A Critical Romp Through the Terribly Libertarian Culture of High-Tech.

Barbrook argues that libertarian transhumanists are proponents of the Californian Ideology who embrace the goal of reactionary modernism: economic growth without social mobility. According to Barbrook, libertarian transhumanists are unwittingly appropriating the theoretical legacy of Stalinist communism by substituting, among other concepts, the "vanguard party" with the "digerati", and the "new Soviet man" with the "posthuman". Dery coined the dismissive phrase "body-loathing" to describe the attitude of libertarian transhumanists and those in the cyberculture who want to escape from their "meat puppet" through mind uploading into cyberspace. Borsook asserts that libertarian transhumanists indulge in a subculture of selfishness, elitism, and escapism.

Sociologist James Hughes is a prominent critic of libertarian transhumanism. While articulating "democratic transhumanism" as a sociopolitical program in his 2004 book Citizen Cyborg, Hughes sought to convince libertarian transhumanists to embrace social democracy by arguing that:

1. State action is required to address catastrophic threats from transhumanist technologies;
2. Only believable and effective public policies to prevent adverse consequences from new technologies will reassure skittish publics that they do not have to be banned;
3. Social policies must explicitly address public concerns that transhumanist biotechnologies will exacerbate social inequality;
4. Monopolistic practices and overly restrictive intellectual property law can seriously delay the development of transhumanist technologies, and restrict their access;
5. Only a strong liberal democratic state can ensure that posthumans are not persecuted; and
6. Libertarian transhumanists (who are anti-naturalists) are inconsistent in arguing for the free market on the grounds that it is a natural phenomenon.

Klaus-Gerd Giesen, a German political scientist specializing in the philosophy of technology, wrote a critique of the libertarianism he imputes to all transhumanists. While pointing out that the works of Austrian School economist Friedrich Hayek figure in practically all of the recommended reading lists of Extropians, he argues that transhumanists, convinced of the sole virtues of the free market, advocate an unabashed inegalitarianism and merciless meritocracy which can be reduced in reality to a biological fetish. He is especially critical of their promotion of a science-fictional liberal eugenics, virulently opposed to any political regulation of human genetics, where the consumerist model presides over their ideology. Giesen concludes that the despair of finding social and political solutions to today's sociopolitical problems incites transhumanists to reduce everything to the hereditary gene, as a fantasy of omnipotence to be found within the individual, even if it means transforming the subject (human) to a new draft (posthuman).

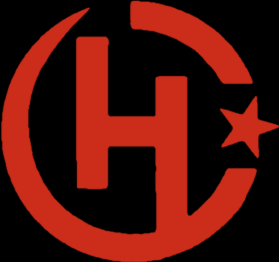
Symbol of Left Transhumanism

== Left transhumanism ==
Left transhumanism is a political ideology synthesizing left-wing ideas and transhumanism.

Left transhumanists believe an egalitarian approach to society and economics must be put within a transhumanist context, arguing that without egalitarianism, transhumanism will amount to a form of elitism due to free-market mechanisms. Furthermore, it is argued that this trend is already occurring in the early stages, citing Bryan Johnson's costly medical treatments and Jeff Bezos' Altos Labs as a case in point that the capitalist class is slowly gaining the ability to obtain longevity treatments while the rest of humanity dies at a rate of 100,000 per day.

=== Basis ===
Left transhumanists hold that a new society must come about either through revolution or reforms for the masses of people to truly experience the opportunities of a transhumanist society, despite the abundance that may occur if a society has vastly automated labor. The social relations which dictate society will not allow that abundance to be distributed in a egalitarian manner under capitalism. Left transhumanists often point to food production and hunger as well as the producible results of fast fashion and the 1 billion people without shoes as foreshadowing of the conditions which will encompass longevity treatments or an abundance of resources. In addition, left transhumanists assert that transhumanism should return to its roots in regards to economics, holding that a return to a transhumanism akin to Russian cosmism or individuals such as Alexander Bogdanov, Konstantin Tsiolkovsky, or Ivan Yefremov may aid the promotion of transhumanist ideals, similar to the relationship between Russian cosmism and socialism.

=== Criticisms ===
Jeffrey Noonan argues that a Marxist transhumanism is politically and ethically incoherent. While it is true that transhumanists and Marxists believe that human beings are self-determining and self-transforming, transhumanists are committed to transcending the material conditions of organic life with their ultimate aim being to encourage the emergence of an artificial superintelligence whose self-creative capacities are not limited by the needs of organic life forms. Socialism, by contrast, is a political and ethical movement committed to ending the suffering caused by capitalism, by changing social institutions and the values according to which resources are distributed and utilized.

== Contrasting stances ==
=== Philosophical ===
Critics argue that libertarian transhumanism’s push for universal human enhancement reflects a philosophical hubris, akin to Enlightenment absolutism or despotism, presuming individual rational egoism can override shared human values and dictate a posthuman future for all. By asserting that technologies like genetic engineering or cognitive augmentation should universally reshape humanity, it is seen to violate humanism’s reverence for collective dignity and moral limits honoring humanity’s intrinsic sanctity. This imposition, framed as reason’s inevitable triumph, is critiqued as an ethical overreach that risks eroding the shared essence of human existence.

=== Bioconservatism ===
Bioconservatism (a portmanteau word combining "biology" and "conservatism") is a stance of opposition to modifying human nature, especially when perceived to threaten a given social order. Strong bioconservative positions include opposition to genetic modification of food crops, the cloning and genetic engineering of livestock and pets, and, most prominently, rejection of the genetic, prosthetic, and cognitive modification of human beings to overcome what are broadly perceived as current human biological and cultural limitations.

Bioconservatives range in political perspective from right-leaning religious and cultural conservatives to left-leaning environmentalists and technology critics. What unifies bioconservatives is skepticism about medical and other biotechnological transformations of the living world. Typically less sweeping as a critique of technological society than bioluddism, the bioconservative perspective is characterized by its defense of the natural, deployed as a moral category.

Despite being opposed, both transhumanism and bioconservatism, in their more moderate expressions, share an opposition to unsafe, unfair, undemocratic forms of technological development, and both recognize that such developmental modes can facilitate unacceptable recklessness and exploitation, exacerbate injustice and incubate dangerous social discontent.

== See also ==
- Bioethics
- Cognitive liberty
- Left-libertarianism
- Outline of libertarianism
- Secular humanism
- Self-ownership
- Technogaianism
- Technological utopianism
- Techno-progressivism
- Transhumanism § Genetic divide
