= James Hughes (sociologist) =

American sociologist and bioethicist (born 1961)

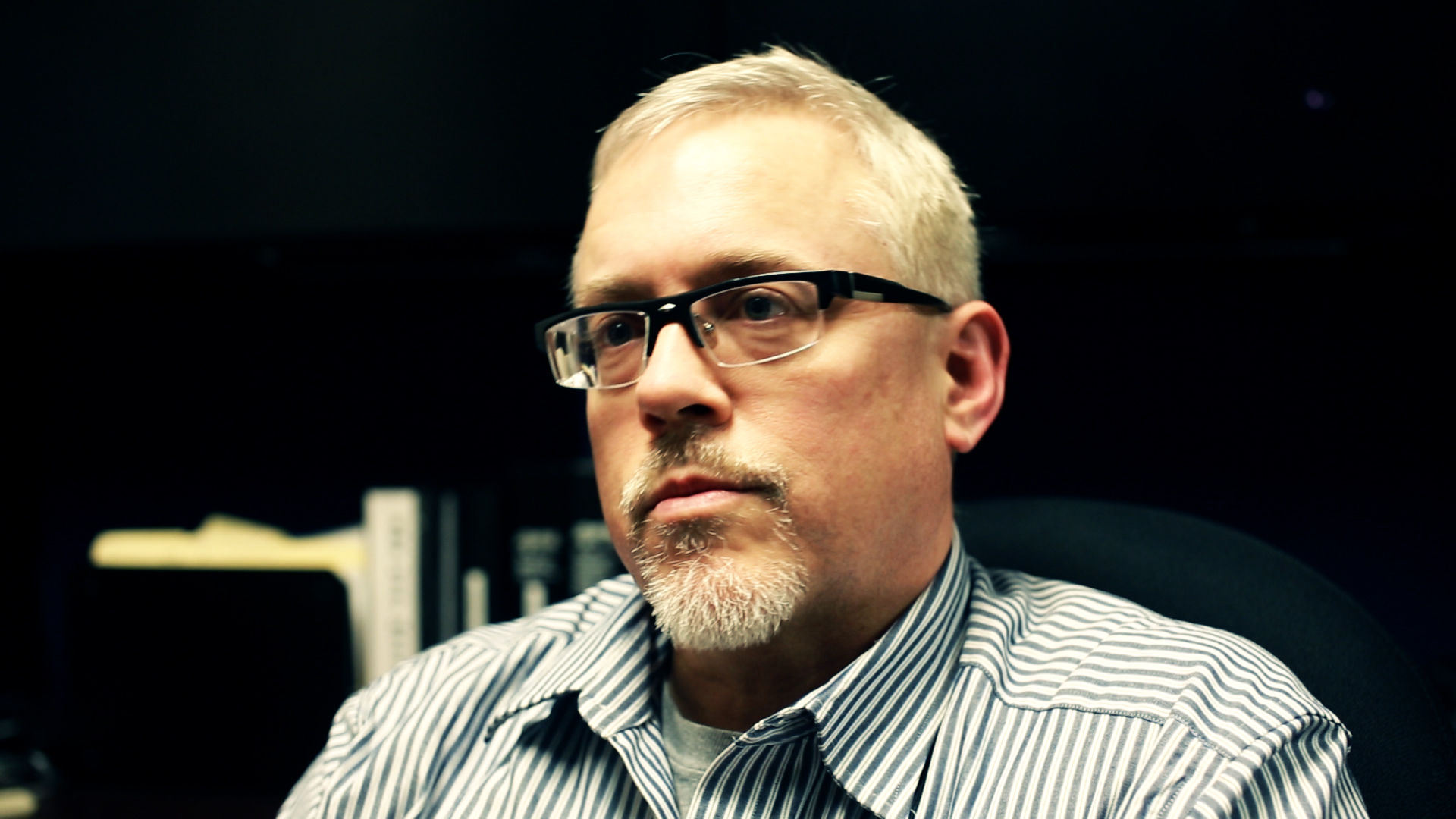
- Hughes in San Francisco, 2012
- Born: James J. Hughes; May 27, 1961 (age 65); Columbus, Ohio, U.S.
- Education: Oberlin College (B.A.); University of Chicago (M.A., Ph.D.)
- Known for: Executive director at Institute for Ethics and Emerging Technologies (IEET)
- Notable work: Citizen Cyborg
- Spouse: Monica Bock
- Website: http://ieet.org

James J. Hughes (born May 27, 1961) is an American sociologist, bioethicist and futurist. He is the executive director of the Institute for Ethics and Emerging Technologies and is the Associate Provost for institutional research, assessment, and planning at University of Massachusetts Boston. He is the author of Citizen Cyborg: Why Democratic Societies Must Respond to the Redesigned Human of the Future and is currently writing a book on secular Buddhism and moral bioenhancement tentatively titled Cyborg Buddha: Using Neurotechnology to Become Better People.

== Biography ==
Hughes holds a doctorate in sociology from the University of Chicago, where he served as the assistant director of research for the MacLean Center for Clinical Medical Ethics. Before graduate school he was temporarily ordained as a Buddhist monk in 1984 while working as a volunteer in Sri Lanka for the development organization Sarvodaya from 1983 to 1985.

Hughes served as executive director of the World Transhumanist Association from 2004 to 2006 and currently serves as executive director of the Institute for Ethics and Emerging Technologies, which he founded with Nick Bostrom. He also produced the syndicated weekly public affairs radio talk show program Changesurfer Radio and contributed to the Cyborg Democracy blog. Hughes' book Citizen Cyborg: Why Democratic Societies Must Respond to the Redesigned Human of the Future was published by Westview Press in November 2004.

Before working at UMass Boston, he lectured at Northwestern University, the University of Connecticut, and Trinity College.

Rejecting bioconservatism and libertarian transhumanism, Hughes argues for democratic transhumanism, a radical form of techno-progressivism that asserts that the best possible "posthuman future" is achievable only by ensuring that human enhancement technologies are safe, made available to everyone, and respect the right of individuals to control their own bodies.

Hughes sits on the academic advisory council of the Christian Transhumanist Association.

== Works ==
- "Embracing Change with All Four Arms: A Post-Humanist Defense of Genetic Engineering". Eubios Journal of Asian and International Bioethics 6(4), 94–101
- Hughes, James (2002). "Politics of Transhumanism ". 2001 Annual Meeting of the Society for Social Studies of Science
- Hughes, James (2002). "Democratic Transhumanism 2.0 ". Transhumanity blog
- Hughes, James (2002–2004). Changesurfing Archived Betterhumans column
- Hughes, James (2004). Book: Citizen Cyborg: Why Democratic Societies Must Respond to the Redesigned Human of the Future. Westview Press. ISBN 0-8133-4198-1
- A collection of interviews and presentations at Science, Technology & the Future.
- LaGrandeur, Kevin; Hughes, James J. (Eds.) (2017). Surviving the Machine Age: Intelligent Technology and the Transformation of Human Work. ISBN 9783319511641
- Up-and-coming book: Cyborg Buddha: Using Neurotechnology to Become Better People.

== See also ==
- Body hacking
- Body modification
- Cognitive liberty
- Cyberfeminism
- Cyborg
- E-democracy
- Friendly artificial intelligence
- Gattaca § Transhumanism
- Human enhancement
- Intelligence amplification
- Liberal eugenics
- Life extension
- Moral enhancement
- Morphological freedom
- Nanosocialism
- Neuroenhancement
- Neuroscience of religion
- Personal genomics
- Postgenderism
- Posthuman
- Posthumanism
- Post-work society
- Space advocacy
- Technogaianism
- Technological utopianism
- Technoprogressivism
- Transhuman
- Transhumanism § Socioeconomic effects
