= Techno-progressivism =

Stance of active support for the convergence of technological and social change

Techno-progressivism, or tech-progressivism, is a stance of active support for the convergence of technological change and social change. Techno-progressives argue that technological developments can be profoundly empowering and emancipatory when they are regulated by legitimate democratic and accountable authorities to ensure that their costs, risks and benefits are all fairly shared by the actual stakeholders to those developments. One of the first mentions of techno-progressivism appeared within extropian jargon in 1999 as the removal of "all political, cultural, biological, and psychological limits to self-actualization and self-realization".

== Stance ==
Techno-progressivism maintains that accounts of progress should focus on scientific and technical dimensions, as well as ethical and social ones. For most techno-progressive perspectives, then, the growth of scientific knowledge or the accumulation of technological powers will not represent the achievement of proper progress unless and until it is accompanied by a just distribution of the costs, risks, and benefits of these new knowledges and capacities. At the same time, for most techno-progressive critics and advocates, the achievement of better democracy, greater fairness, less violence, and a wider rights culture are all desirable, but inadequate in themselves to confront the quandaries of contemporary technological societies unless and until they are accompanied by progress in science and technology to support and implement these values.

Strong techno-progressive positions include support for the civil right of a person to either maintain or modify their own mind and body, on their own terms, through informed, consensual recourse to, or refusal of, available therapeutic or enabling biomedical technology.

During the November 2014 Transvision Conference, many of the leading transhumanist organizations signed the Technoprogressive Declaration, which stated the values of technoprogressivism.

== List of notable techno-progressive social critics ==
- Technocritic Dale Carrico with his accounts of techno-progressivism
- Philosopher Donna Haraway with her accounts of cyborg theory.
- Media theorist Douglas Rushkoff with his accounts of open source.
- Cultural critic Mark Dery and his accounts of cyberculture.
- Science journalist Chris Mooney with his account of the U.S. Republican Party's "war on science".
- Futurist Bruce Sterling with his Viridian design movement.
- Futurist Alex Steffen and his accounts of bright green environmentalism through the Worldchanging blog.
- Science journalist Annalee Newitz with her accounts of the Biopunk.
- Bioethicist James Hughes of the Institute for Ethics and Emerging Technologies with his accounts of democratic transhumanism.

== See also ==
- Algocracy
- Body modification
- Bioethics
- Biopolitics
- Digital freedom
  - Free software movement
- Frontierism
- Fordism
- High modernism
- Manifest Destiny
- New Frontier
- Post-scarcity economy
- Progress Studies
- Scientism
- Technocentrism
- Techno-utopianism
- Transhumanist politics
