= Gattaca =

1997 film by Andrew Niccol

- Theatrical release poster
- Directed by: Andrew Niccol
- Written by: Andrew Niccol
- Produced by: Danny DeVito; Michael Shamberg; Stacey Sher; Gail Lyon
- Starring: Ethan Hawke; Uma Thurman; Alan Arkin; Jude Law; Loren Dean; Gore Vidal
- Cinematography: Sławomir Idziak
- Edited by: Lisa Zeno Churgin
- Music by: Michael Nyman
- Production companies: Columbia Pictures; Jersey Films
- Distributed by: Sony Pictures Releasing
- Release date: October 24, 1997 (United States)
- Running time: 106 minutes
- Country: United States
- Languages: English; Esperanto
- Budget: $36 million
- Box office: $12.5 million (domestic only)

Gattaca is a 1997 American dystopian science fiction film written and directed by Andrew Niccol in his feature directorial debut. It stars Ethan Hawke and Uma Thurman with Jude Law, Loren Dean, Ernest Borgnine, Gore Vidal, and Alan Arkin appearing in supporting roles. The film presents a future society driven by eugenics where children are conceived through genetic selection to ensure they possess the best hereditary traits of their parents. The principal character, Vincent Freeman, played by Hawke, was conceived outside the eugenics program and struggles to overcome genetic discrimination to realize his dream of going into space.

The film draws on concerns over reproductive technologies that facilitate eugenics, and the possible consequences of such technological developments for society. It also explores the idea of destiny and the ways in which it can and does govern lives. Characters in Gattaca continually battle both with society and with themselves to find their place in the world and who they are destined to be according to their genes.

The film's title is based on the letters G, A, T, and C, which stand for guanine, adenine, thymine, and cytosine, the four nucleobases of DNA. It was a 1997 nominee for the Academy Award for Best Art Direction and the Golden Globe Award for Best Original Score. A follow-up series was in development at Showtime, but has been cancelled as of 2023.

== Plot ==
In the "not-too-distant" future, eugenics is common. A genetic registry database uses biometrics to classify those so created as "valids" while those conceived naturally and more susceptible to genetic disorders are known as "in-valids". Genetic discrimination is illegal, but in practice genotype profiling is used to identify valids to qualify for professional employment while in-valids are relegated to menial jobs.

Vincent Freeman was conceived naturally, and his genetic profile indicates a high probability of several disorders and an estimated lifespan of 30.2 years. His parents, regretting their decision, use genetic selection in conceiving their second child, Anton Jr. Growing up, the two brothers often play a game of "chicken" by swimming out to sea as far as possible, with the first one returning to shore considered the loser; Vincent always loses. Vincent dreams of a career in space travel, but is always reminded of his genetic inferiority. One day, Vincent challenges Anton to a game of chicken and beats him. Anton starts to drown and is saved by Vincent. Shortly after, Vincent leaves home.

Years later, Vincent works cleaning office spaces, including that of spaceflight conglomerate Gattaca Aerospace Corporation. He gets a chance to pose as a valid with a "borrowed ladder", using donated hair, skin, blood, and urine samples from former swimming star Jerome Eugene Morrow, who was paralyzed after being hit by a car. With Jerome's genetic makeup, Vincent gains employment at Gattaca and is assigned as a navigator for an upcoming mission to Saturn's moon Titan. To conceal his identity, Vincent must meticulously groom and scrub his body daily to remove his own genetic material, pass daily DNA scanning and urine tests using Jerome's samples, and hide his heart defect.

When a Gattaca administrator is murdered a week before a possible launch, the police find one of Vincent's eyelashes near the crime scene, but can only identify it as from an "unregistered" in-valid, and thus launch an investigation to find who owns the eyelash. During this, Vincent becomes close to a co-worker, Irene Cassini, and falls in love with her. Though a valid, Irene has a higher risk of heart failure that will bar her from any deep space mission. Vincent also learns that Jerome's paralysis is self-inflicted; after placing silver in the Olympics, Jerome threw himself in front of a car. Jerome maintains that he was designed to be the best, yet somehow was not, and is suffering because of this.

Vincent repeatedly evades the grasp of the investigation. Finally, it is revealed that Gattaca's mission director Josef killed the administrator because he threatened to cancel the mission. Vincent learns that the detective who closed the case was his brother Anton, who consequently has discovered Vincent's presence. The brothers meet, and Anton warns Vincent about his illegal actions, but Vincent asserts that he has gotten to this position on his own merits. Anton challenges Vincent to a final game of chicken. As the two swim out at night, Vincent's stamina surprises Anton, so Vincent reveals that he won by not saving energy for the swim back. Anton turns back and begins to drown, but Vincent rescues him a second time and swims them back to shore.

On the day of the launch, Jerome reveals that he has stored enough DNA samples for Vincent to last two lifetimes upon his return and gives him an envelope to open once in flight. After saying goodbye to Irene, Vincent prepares to board, but discovers there is a final genetic test, and he currently lacks any of Jerome's samples. He is surprised when Dr. Lamar, who oversees background checks, reveals that he knows Vincent has been posing as a valid. Lamar admits that his son looks up to Vincent and wonders whether his son, who is genetically selected, but "not all that they promised", could exceed his potential just as Vincent has. The doctor changes the test results, allowing Vincent to pass.

As the rocket launches, Jerome dons his swimming medal and immolates himself in his home's incinerator. Vincent opens the note to find a lock of Jerome's hair.

== Cast ==
- Ethan Hawke as Vincent Freeman, impersonating Jerome Eugene Morrow
  - Mason Gamble as young Vincent
  - Chad Christ as teenage Vincent
- Uma Thurman as Irene Cassini
- Jude Law as Jerome Eugene Morrow
- Loren Dean as Anton Freeman
  - Vincent Nielson as young Anton
  - William Lee Scott as teenage Anton
- Gore Vidal as Director Josef
- Xander Berkeley as Dr. Lamar
- Jayne Brook as Marie Freeman
- Elias Koteas as Antonio Freeman
- Maya Rudolph as delivery nurse
- Blair Underwood as geneticist
- Ernest Borgnine as Caesar
- Tony Shalhoub as German
- Alan Arkin as Detective Hugo
- Dean Norris as cop on the beat
- Ken Marino as sequencing technician
- Cynthia Martells as Cavendish
- Gabrielle Reece as Gattaca trainer

== Production ==
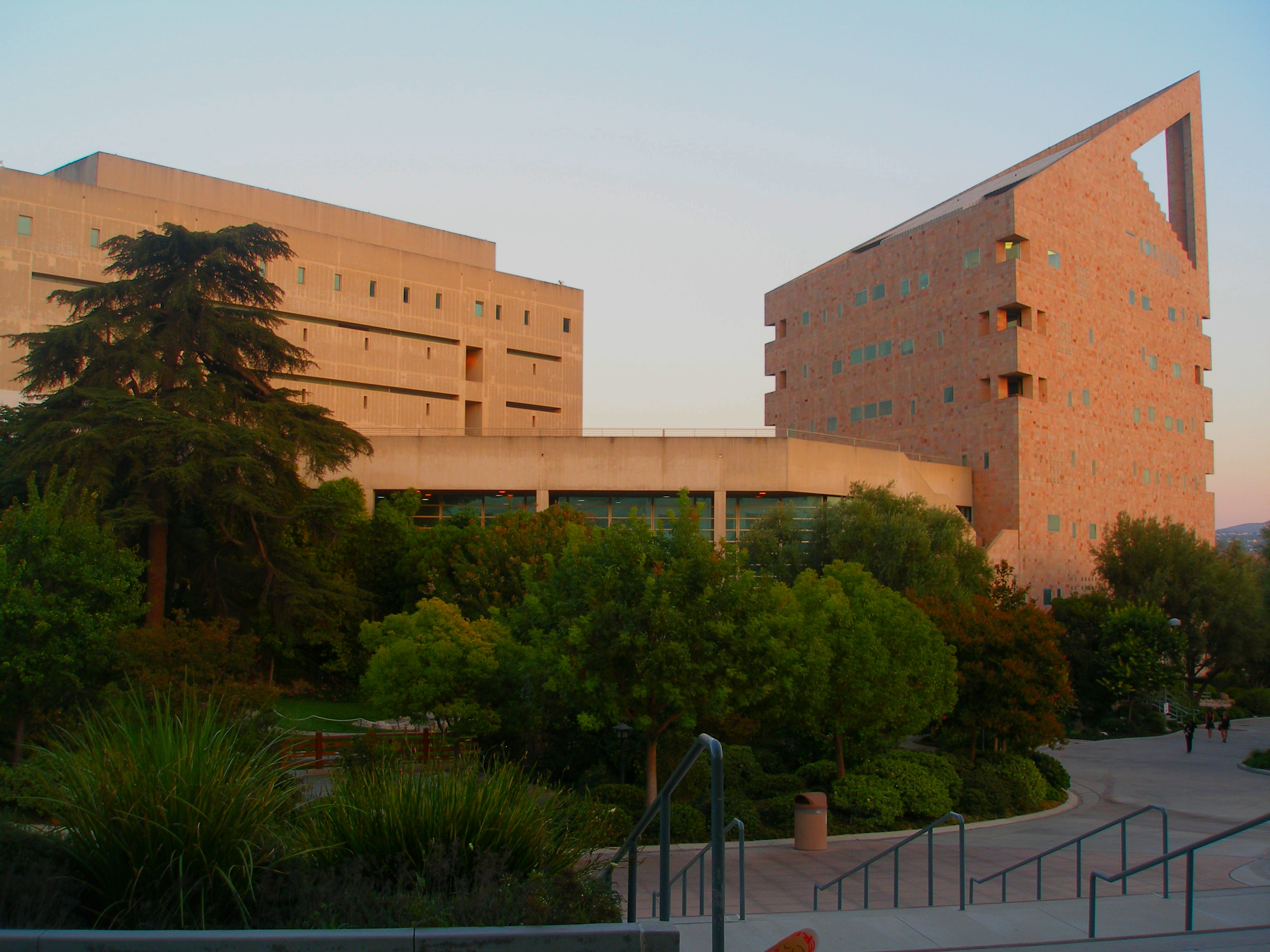
CLA Building complex

Marin County Civic Center

The film was shot under the working title The Eighth Day, a reference to the seven days of creation in the Bible. However, by the time its release was scheduled for the fall of 1997, the Belgian film Le huitième jour had already been released in the US under the title The Eighth Day. As a result, the film was retitled Gattaca, which takes inspiration from the letters G, A, T, and C, derived from the four nucleobases of DNA: guanine, adenine, thymine and cytosine.

=== Filming ===
The exteriors (including the roof scene) and some of the interior shots of the Gattaca complex were filmed at Frank Lloyd Wright's 1960 Marin County Civic Center in San Rafael, California. The speakers in the complex broadcast announcements in both Esperanto and English; Miko Sloper from the Esperanto League of North America went to the recording studio to handle the Esperanto part.

=== Design ===
The movie uses a swimming treadmill in the opening minutes to punctuate the swimming and futuristic themes. The production design makes heavy use of retrofuturism; the futuristic electric cars are based on 1960s car models like Rover P6, Citroën DS19 and Studebaker Avanti.

=== Title sequence ===
The opening title sequence, created by Michael Riley, features closeups of body matter (fingernails and hair), which are later revealed to be from Vincent's daily bodily scourings, hitting the floor accompanied by loud sounds as the objects strike the ground. According to Riley, oversized models of the fingernails and hair were created for the effect.

== Music and soundtrack ==
Gattaca: Original Motion Picture Soundtrack

Soundtrack album by Michael Nyman
- Released: October 21, 1997
- Genres: Contemporary classical music, film scores, minimalism
- Length: 54:55
- Label: Virgin Records America
- Producer: Michael Nyman

Michael Nyman chronology
Concertos (1997)	Gattaca: Original Motion Picture Soundtrack (1997)	The Suit and the Photograph (1998)

The score for Gattaca was composed by Michael Nyman, and the original soundtrack was released on October 21, 1997.

== Release ==
=== Box office ===
Gattaca was released in theaters on October 24, 1997, in the United States by Columbia Pictures and opened at number 5 at the box office; trailing I Know What You Did Last Summer, The Devil's Advocate, Kiss the Girls and Seven Years in Tibet. Over the first weekend the film brought in $4.3 million. It ended its theatrical run with a domestic total of $12.5 million against a reported production budget of $36 million.

=== Home media ===
Gattaca was released on DVD on July 1, 1998, and was also released on Superbit DVD. Special Edition DVD and Blu-ray versions were released on March 11, 2008. Both editions contain a deleted scene featuring historical figures like Einstein, Lincoln, etc., who are described as having been genetically deficient.

Gattaca was released on Ultra HD Blu-ray in 2021.

== Reception ==
=== Critical response ===
Gattaca received positive reviews from critics. The film received an approval rating of 82% on Rotten Tomatoes based on 66 reviews, with a rating average of 7.1/10. The site's critical consensus states that "Intelligent and scientifically provocative, Gattaca is an absorbing sci-fi drama that poses important interesting ethical questions about the nature of science." On Metacritic, the film received "generally favorable" reviews with a score of 64 out of 100, based on 20 reviews. Audiences polled by CinemaScore gave the film an average grade of "B−" on an A+ to F scale.

Siskel and Ebert gave the film two thumbs up on the October 25, 1997, episode of their program, with Gene Siskel commenting that the film had a "smart script". In his other review for the Chicago Sun-Times, Roger Ebert stated, "This is one of the smartest and most provocative of science fiction films, a thriller with ideas." James Berardinelli praised it for "energy and tautness" and its "thought-provoking script and thematic richness."

Although critically acclaimed, Gattaca was not a box office success, but it is said to have crystallized the debate over the controversial topic of human genetic engineering. The film's dystopian depiction of "genoism" has been cited by many bioethicists and laypeople in support of their hesitancy about, or opposition to, eugenics and the societal acceptance of the genetic-determinist ideology that may frame it. In a 1997 review of the film for the journal Nature Genetics, molecular biologist Lee M. Silver stated that "Gattaca is a film that all geneticists should see if for no other reason than to understand the perception of our trade held by so many of the public-at-large".

=== Accolades ===
Award	Category	Recipient	Result
Academy Awards	Best Art Direction	Jan Roelfs; Nancy Nye	Nominated
Art Directors Guild Award	Excellence in Production Design	Jan Roelfs; Sarah Knowles; Natalie Richards	Nominated
Bogey Awards	Bogey Award	Gattaca	Won
Gérardmer Film Festival	Special Jury Prize	Andrew Niccol	Won
Gérardmer Film Festival	Fun Trophy	Andrew Niccol	Won
Golden Globe Awards	Best Original Score	Michael Nyman	Nominated
Hugo Awards	Best Dramatic Presentation	Andrew Niccol	Nominated
London Film Critics' Circle Awards	Best Screenwriter of the Year	Andrew Niccol	Won
Paris Film Festival	Grand Prix	Gattaca	Nominated
Satellite Awards	Best Art Direction and Production Design	Jan Roelfs	Nominated
Saturn Awards	Best Costume	Colleen Atwood	Nominated
Saturn Awards	Best Music	Michael Nyman	Nominated
Saturn Awards	Best Home Video Release	Gattaca	Nominated
Sitges Film Festival	Best Motion Picture	Andrew Niccol	Won
Sitges Film Festival	Best Original Soundtrack	Michael Nyman	Won

== Continuation ==
On October 30, 2009, Variety reported that Sony Pictures Television was developing a television adaptation of the feature film as a one-hour police procedural set in the future. The show was to be written by Gil Grant, who has written for 24 and NCIS. A Gattaca television series was revealed to be in development at Sony and Showtime in March 2023. It was intended to take place one generation after the events of the film. Howard Gordon and Alex Gansa were tapped as showrunners, and were also expected to serve as screenwriters alongside Craig Borten. Gordon, Gansa, Glenn Gellar, and actor Danny DeVito (who produced the film) would have served as executive producers. However, in June 2023, Showtime announced that they had abandoned plans to produce the show.

== Legacy ==
=== Influence on In Time ===
Writer-director Andrew Niccol has called his 2011 film In Time a "bastard child of Gattaca". Both films feature classic cars in a futuristic dystopia as well as a caste privilege schism which the protagonist challenges and which prejudices the authorities into neglecting a thorough investigation in favor of condemning the protagonist.

=== Political references ===
U.S. Senator Rand Paul used near-verbatim portions of the plot summary from the English Wikipedia entry on Gattaca in a speech at Liberty University on October 28, 2013, in support of Virginia Attorney General Ken Cuccinelli's campaign for Governor of Virginia. Paul said that abortion rights advocates are advancing eugenics in a manner similar to the events in Gattaca.

=== Transhumanism ===
In the 2004 democratic transhumanist book Citizen Cyborg, bioethicist James Hughes criticized the premise and influence of the film as fear-mongering, arguing:

1. Astronaut-training programs are entirely justified in attempting to screen out people with heart problems for safety reasons;
2. In the United States, people are already screened by insurance companies on the basis of their propensities to disease, for actuarial purposes;
3. Rather than banning genetic testing or genetic enhancement, society should develop genetic information privacy laws, such as the U.S. Genetic Information Nondiscrimination Act signed into law on May 21, 2008, that allow justified forms of genetic testing and data aggregation, but forbid those that are judged to result in genetic discrimination. Citizens should then be able to make a complaint to the appropriate authority if they believe they have been discriminated against because of their genotype.

== See also ==
- Assisted reproductive technology
- List of films featuring surveillance
- Transhumanism § Socioeconomic effects
