= Citizen Cyborg =

2004 non-fiction book by James Hughes

Citizen Cyborg: Why Democratic Societies Must Respond to the Redesigned Human of the Future
- Author: James Hughes
- Publisher: Westview Press (hardcover); Basic Books (paperback)
- Publication date: October 31, 2004
- Pages: 294 (hardcover); 320 (paperback)
- ISBN: 0-8133-4198-1
- OCLC: 56632213

Citizen Cyborg: Why Democratic Societies Must Respond to the Redesigned Human of the Future is a 2004 non-fiction book by bioethicist and sociologist James Hughes, which articulates democratic transhumanism as a socio-political ideology and program.

The editors of the popular science magazine Scientific American recommended Citizen Cyborg in their April 2005 issue.

== See also ==
- Bioconservatism
- Democratic transhumanism
- Gattaca critical reception
- Libertarian transhumanism
