= Bioconservatism =

Cautious stance towards modifying human nature

Bioconservatism is a philosophical and ethical stance that emphasizes caution and restraint in the use of biotechnologies, particularly those involving genetic manipulation and human enhancement.

Bioconservatism is characterized by a belief that technological trends risk compromising human dignity, and by opposition to movements and technologies including transhumanism, human genetic modification, "strong" artificial intelligence, and the technological singularity. Many bioconservatives also oppose the use of technologies such as life extension and preimplantation genetic screening.

Bioconservatives range in political perspective from right-leaning religious and cultural conservatives to left-leaning environmentalists and technology critics. What unifies bioconservatives is skepticism about medical and other biotechnological transformations of the living world. In contrast to bioluddism, the bioconservative perspective typically presents a more focused critique of technological society. It is distinguished by its defense of the natural, framed as a moral category.

Critics of bioconservatism, such as Steve Clarke and Rebecca Roache, argue that bioconservatives ground their views primarily in intuition, which can be subject to various cognitive biases. They consider bioconservatives to be unable to provide concrete reasons to justify their intuitions, contributing to stalled debate around human enhancement.

== Advocates ==
Bioconservatives seek to counter the arguments made by transhumanists who support the use of human enhancement technologies despite acknowledging the risks they involve. Transhumanists hold that certain technologies have the potential to significantly alter current conceptions of what it means to be human and consider them essential for the future development of humanity. Transhumanist philosophers such as Nick Bostrom believe that genetic modification will be essential to improving human health in the future.

The three major elements of the bioconservative argument, as described by Bostrom, are that human augmentation is innately degrading and therefore harmful; that the existence of augmented humans poses a threat to "ordinary humans;"and that human augmentation shows a lack of acknowledgement that "not everything in the world is open to any use we may desire or devise." The first two of these elements are secular, the last derives "from religious or crypto-religious sentiments."

=== Michael Sandel ===
Michael J. Sandel is an American political philosopher and a prominent bioconservative. His article and subsequent book, both titled The Case Against Perfection, concern the moral permissibility of genetic engineering or genome editing. Sandel compares genetic and non-genetic forms of enhancement, pointing to the fact that much of non-genetic alteration has largely the same effect as genetic engineering. SAT tutors or study drugs such as Ritalin can have similar effects as minor tampering with natural born intelligence. Sandel uses such examples to argue that the most important moral issue with genetic engineering is not that the consequences of manipulating human nature will undermine human agency, but the perfectionist aspiration behind such a drive to mastery. For Sandel, "the deepest moral objection to enhancement lies less in the perfection it seeks than in the human disposition it expresses and promotes." For example, the parental desire for a child to be of a certain genetic quality is incompatible with the special kind of unconditional love parents should have for their children. He writes "[t]o appreciate children as gifts is to accept them as they come, not as objects of our design or products of our will or instruments of our ambition."

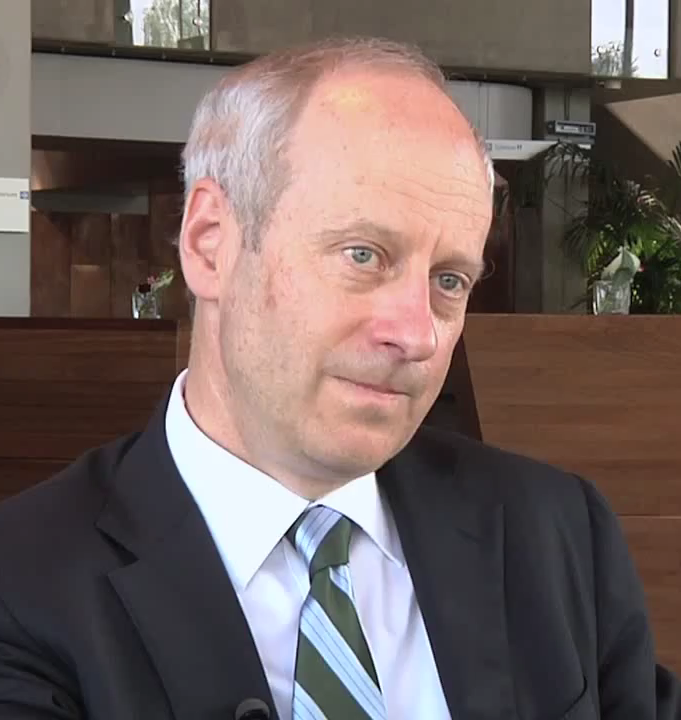
Michael Sandel in 2012

Sandel insists that consequentialist arguments overlook the principle issue of whether bioenhancement should be aspired to at all. He is attributed with the view that human augmentation should be avoided as it expresses an excessive desire to change oneself and 'become masters of our nature.' For example, in the field of cognitive enhancement, he argues that moral question we should be concerned with is not the consequences of inequality of access to such technology in possibly creating two classes of humans but whether we should aspire to such enhancement at all. Similarly, he has argued that the ethical problem with genetic engineering is not that it undermines the child's autonomy, as this claim "wrongly implies that absent a designing parent, children are free to choose their characteristics for themselves." Rather, he sees enhancement as hubristic, taking nature into our own hands: pursuing the fixity of enhancement is an instance of vanity. Sandel also criticizes the argument that a genetically engineered athlete would have an unfair advantage over his unenhanced competitors, suggesting that it has always been the case that some athletes are better endowed genetically than others. In short, Sandel argues that the real ethical problems with genetic engineering concern its effects on humility, responsibility and solidarity.

==== Humility ====
Sandel argues that humility is a moral virtue that will be undermined by genetic engineering. He argues that humility encourages one to 'abide the unexpected, to live with dissonance, to rein in the impulse control,' and therefore, is worth fostering in all aspects of one's life. This includes the humility of parents regarding their own genetic endowment and that of their children. Sandel's concern is that, through genetic engineering, the relationship between parent and child is "disfigured:"

The problem lies in the hubris of the designing parents, in their drive to master the mystery of genetics. Even if this disposition did not make parents tyrants to their children, it would disfigure the relation between parent and child, thus depriving the parent of the humility and enlarged human sympathies that an openness to the unbidden can cultivate.

Essentially, Sandel believes that in order to be a good parent with the virtue of humility, one needs to accept that their child may not progress exactly according to their expectations. Designing an athletic child, for example, is incompatible with the idea of parents having such open expectations. He argues that genetic enhancement deprives the parent of the humility of an 'openness to the unbidden' fosters. Sandel believes that parents must be prepared to love their child unconditionally and to see their children as gifts from nature, rather than entities to be defined according to parental and genetic expectations. Moreover, in the paper The Case Against Perfection, Sandel argues:

I do not think the main problem with enhancement and genetic engineering is that they undermine effort and erode human agency. The deeper danger is that they represent a kind of hyperagency—a Promethean aspiration to remake nature, including human nature, to serve our purposes and satisfy our desires".

In doing so, Sandel worries that an essential aspect of human nature—and the meaning of life derived from such—would be eroded in the process of expanding radically beyond humankind's naturally endowed capacities. He calls this yearning the "Promethean project," which is necessarily constrained by appreciating humankind's humility and place in nature. Sandel adds:

It is in part a religious sensibility. But its resonance reaches beyond religion.

==== Responsibility ====
Sandel argues that due to the increasing role of genetic enhancement, there will be an 'explosion' of responsibility on humanity. He argues that genetic engineering will increase parental responsibility as "parents become responsible for choosing, or failing to choose, the right traits for their children." He believes that such responsibility will lead to genes become a matter of choice rather than a matter of chance. Sandel illustrates this argument through the lens of sports: in athletics, undesirable outcomes are often attributed to extrinsic values such as lack of preparation or lapse in discipline. With the introduction of genetic engineering to athletics, Sandel believes that athletes will bear additional responsibility for their talents and performance; for example, for failing to acquire the intrinsic traits necessary for success. Sandel believes this can be extrapolated to society as a whole: individuals will be forced to shoulder more responsibility for deficiencies in the face of increased genetic choice.

==== Solidarity ====
Sandel points out that without genetic engineering, a child is "at the mercy of the genetic lottery." Insurance markets allow a pooling of risk for the benefit of all: those who turn out to be healthy subsidize those who are not. This could be phrased more generally as: individual success is not fully determined by that individual or their parents, as genetic traits are to some extent randomly assigned from a collective pool. Sandel argues that, because we all face the same risks, social insurance schemes that rely on a sense of solidarity are possible. However, genetic enhancement gives individuals perfect genetic knowledge and increased resistance to some diseases. Enhanced individuals would not opt into such a system or such human community, because it would involve guaranteed losses for them. They would feel no debt to their community, and social solidarity would disappear.

Sandel argues that solidarity 'arises when men and women reflect on the contingency of their talents and fortunes.' He argues that if our genetic endowments begin to be seen as 'achievements for which we can claim credit,' society would have no obligation to share with those less fortunate. Consequently, Sandel mounts a case against the perfection of genetic knowledge because it would end the solidarity arising when people reflect on the non-necessary nature of their fortunes.

=== Leon Kass ===
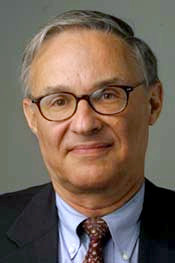
Leon Kass

In his paper "Ageless Bodies, Happy Souls," Leon Kass argues for bioconservatism. His argument was first delivered as a lecture at the Washington D.C. Ethics and Public Policy Center and later published as an article in The Atlantic. Although it was written during the time when Kass chaired the President's Council on Bioethics, the views expressed are his own, and not those of the council.

In brief, he argues that for three main reasons there is something wrong with biotechnological enhancement. Kass calls them the arguments of "the attitude of mastery," "'unnatural' means" and "dubious ends."

Before he turns to these arguments, he focuses on the distinction between "therapy" and "enhancement." While therapy has the aim of (re-)establishing the state of what could be considered as "normal" (e.g. replacement of organs), enhancement gives people an advantage over the "normal workings" of the human body (e.g. immortality). On the basis of this distinction, Kass argues, most people would support therapy, but remain sceptical towards enhancement. However, he believes this distinction is not clear, since it is hard to tell where therapy stops and enhancement begins. One reason he gives is that the "normal workings" of the human body cannot be unambiguously defined due to the variance within humans: someone may be born with perfect pitch, another deaf.

Bostrom and Roache reply to this by giving an instance of a clearly permissible enhancement. They claim that extending a life (i.e. making it longer than it would normally have been) means saving this particular life. Since one would believe it is morally permissible to save lives (as long as no harm is caused), they claim that there is no good reason to believe extending a life is impermissible. The relevance of the counterargument presented by Bostrom and Roache becomes clearer when the essence of Kass's skepticism with 'enhancement' is considered. Firstly, he labels natural human experiences like aging, death and unhappiness as preconditions of human flourishing. Given that technological enhancement diminishes these preconditions and therefore hinders human flourishing, he is able to assert that enhancement is not morally permissible. Bostrom and Roache challenge Kass's inherent assumption that extending life is different from saving it. In other words, they argue that by alleviating ageing and death, someone's life is being extended, which is no different from saving their life. By this argument, the concept of human flourishing becomes entirely irrelevant since it is morally permissible to save someone's life, regardless of whether they are leading a flourishing life or not.

==== The problematic attitude of biotechnological enhancement ====
One of Leon Kass' main arguments on this matter concern the attitude of 'mastery'. Kass implies that although the means are present to modify human nature (both body and mind), the ends remain unknown, filled with unintended consequences:

The human body and mind, highly complex and delicately balanced as a result of eons of gradual and exacting evolution, are almost certainly at risk from any ill-considered attempt at 'improvement'.

Due to the unawareness of the goodness of potential ends, Kass claims this not to be mastery at all. Instead, humanity is acting on the momentary whims that it is being exposed to by nature, effectively making it impossible to escape from the "grip of our own nature."

Kass builds on Sandel's argument that transhumanists fail to properly recognise the 'giftedness' of the world. He agrees that this idea is useful in that it should teach mankind an attitude of modesty, restraint and humility. However, he believes it will not by itself sufficiently indicate which things can be manipulated and which should be left untouched. Therefore, Kass additionally proposes that mankind must also respect the 'givenness' of species-specified natures – 'given' in the sense of something fixed and specified.

==== 'Unnatural' means of biotechnological enhancement ====
Kass refers to biotechnological enhancement as cheating or 'cheap,' because it undermines the feeling of having worked hard to achieve a certain aim. He writes, "The naturalness of means matters. It lies not in the fact that the assisting drugs and devices are artifacts, but in the danger of violating or deforming the deep structure of the natural human activity." By nature, there is "an experiential and intelligible connection between means and ends."

Kass suggests that the struggles one has to go through to achieve excellence "is not only the source of our deeds, but also their product." Therefore, they build character. He maintains that biotechnology as a shortcut does not build character but instead erodes self-control. This can be seen in how confronting fearful things might eventually enable us to cope with our fears, unlike a pill which merely prevents people from experiencing fear and thereby doesn't help us overcome it. As Kass notes, "people who take pills to block out from memory the painful or hateful aspects of new experience will not learn how to deal with suffering or sorrow. A drug to induce fearlessness does not produce courage." He contends that there is a necessity in having limited biotechnological enhancement for humans as it recognises giftedness and forges humility.

Kass notes that while there are biological interventions that may assist in the pursuit of excellence without cheapening its attainment, "partly because many of life's excellences have nothing to do with competition or adversity," (e.g. "drugs to decrease drowsiness or increase alertness... may actually help people in their natural pursuits of learning or painting or performing their civic duty,") "the point is less the exertions of good character against hardship, but the manifestation of an alert and self-experiencing agent making his deeds flow intentionally from his willing, knowing, and embodied soul." Kass argues that humans need to have an "intelligible connection" between means and ends in order to call one's bodies, minds, and transformations genuinely their own.

==== 'Dubious' ends of biotechnological enhancement ====
The case for ageless bodies is that the prevention of decay, decline, and disability, the avoidance of blindness, deafness, and debility, the elimination of feebleness, frailty, and fatigue, are conducive to living fully as a human being at the top of one's powers, and a "good quality of life" from beginning to end.

However, Kass argues that human limitation is what gives the opportunity for happiness. Firstly, he argues that "a concern with one's own improving agelessness is finally incompatible with accepting the need for procreation and human renewal." This creates a world "hostile to children," and arguably "increasingly dominated by anxiety over health and the fear of death." This is because the existence of decline and decay is precisely what allows us to accept mortality. The hostility towards children is resultant of the redundancy of new generations to the progression of the human species, given infinite lifespan; progression and evolution of the human race would no longer arise from procreation and succession, but from the engineered enhancement of existing generations. Secondly, He explains that one needs to grieve in order to love, and that one must feel a lack to be capable of aspiration:

[...] human fulfillment depends on our being creatures of need and finitude and hence of longings and attachment.

Finally, Kass warns, "the engaged and energetic being-at-work of what uniquely gave to us is what we need to treasure and defend. All other perfection is at best a passing illusion, at worst a Faustian bargain that will cost us our full and flourishing humanity."

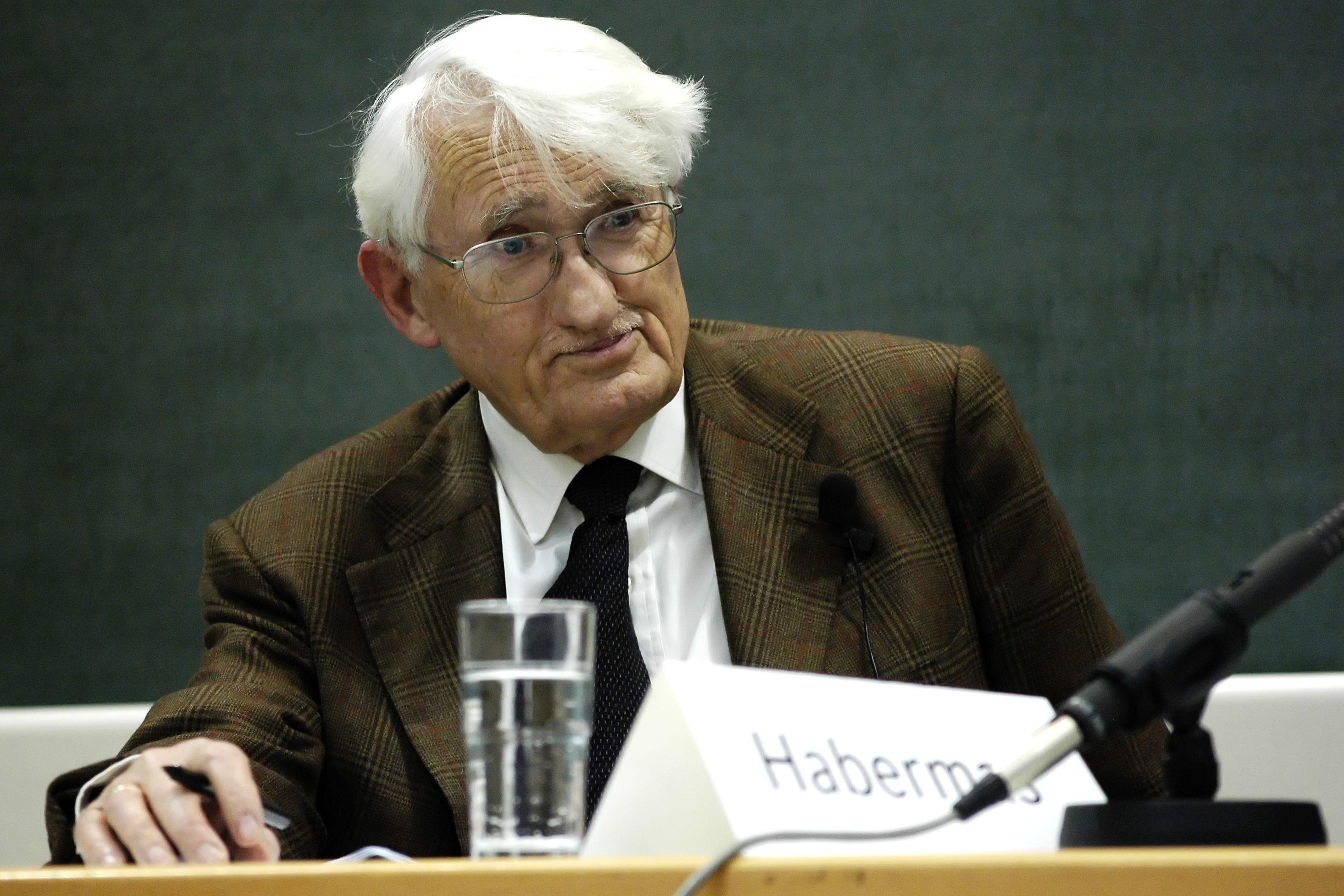
Jurgen Habermas

=== Jürgen Habermas ===
Jürgen Habermas has also written against genetic human enhancement. In his book "The Future of Human Nature," Habermas rejects the use of prenatal genetic technologies to enhance offspring. Habermas rejects genetic human enhancement on two main grounds: the violation of ethical freedom, and the production of asymmetrical relationships. He broadens this discussion by then discussing the tensions between the evolution of science with religion and moral principles.

==== Violation of ethical freedom ====
Habermas points out that a genetic modification produces an external imposition on a person's life that is qualitatively different from any social influence. This prenatal genetic modification will most likely be chosen by one's parents, therefore threatening the ethical freedom and equality that one is entitled to as a birthright. For Habermas, the difference relies in that while socialisation processes can always be contested, genetic designs cannot therefore possess a level of unpredictability. This argument builds on Habermas' magnum opus discourse ethics. For Habermas:

Eugenic interventions aiming at enhancement reduce ethical freedom insofar as they tie down the person concerned to rejected, but irreversible intentions of third parties, barring him from the spontaneous self-perception of being the undivided author of his own life.

==== Asymmetrical relationships ====
Habermas suggested that genetic human enhancements would create asymmetric relationships that endanger democracy, which is premised on the idea of moral equality. He claims that regardless of the scope of the modifications, the very knowledge of enhancement obstructs symmetrical relationships between parents and their children. The child's genome was interfered with nonconsensually, making predecessors responsible for the traits in question. Unlike for thinkers like Fukuyama, Habermas' point is not that these traits might produce different 'types of humans'. Rather, he placed the emphasis on how others are responsible in choosing these traits. This is the fundamental difference between natural traits and human enhancement, and it is what bears decisive weight for Habermas: the child's autonomy as self-determination is violated. However, Habermas does acknowledge that, for example, making one's son very tall in the hope that they will become a basketball player does not automatically determine that he will choose this path.

However, although the opportunity can be turned down, this does not make it any less of a violation from being forced into an irreversible situation. Genetic modification has two large-scale consequences. Firstly, no action the child undertakes can be ascribed to her own negotiation with the natural lottery, since a 'third party' has negotiated on the child's behalf. This imperils the sense of responsibility for one's own life that comes along with freedom. As such, individuals' self-understanding as ethical beings is endangered, opening the door to ethical nihilism. This is so because the genetic modification creates a type of dependence in which one of the parts does not even have the hypothetical possibility of changing social places with the other. Secondly, it becomes impossible to collectively and democratically establish moral rules through communication, since a condition for their establishment is the possibility to question assertions. Genetically modified individuals, however, never realise if their very questioning might have been informed by enhancement, nor can they question it. That being said, Habermas acknowledges that societies are full of asymmetric relationships, such as oppression of minorities or exploitation. However, these conditions could be different. On the contrary, genetic modification cannot be reverted once it is performed.

== Criticism ==
The transhumanist Institute for Ethics and Emerging Technologies criticizes bioconservatism as a form of "human racism" (more commonly known as speciesism), and as being motivated by a "yuck factor" that ignores individual freedoms.

=== Nick Bostrom on posthuman dignity ===
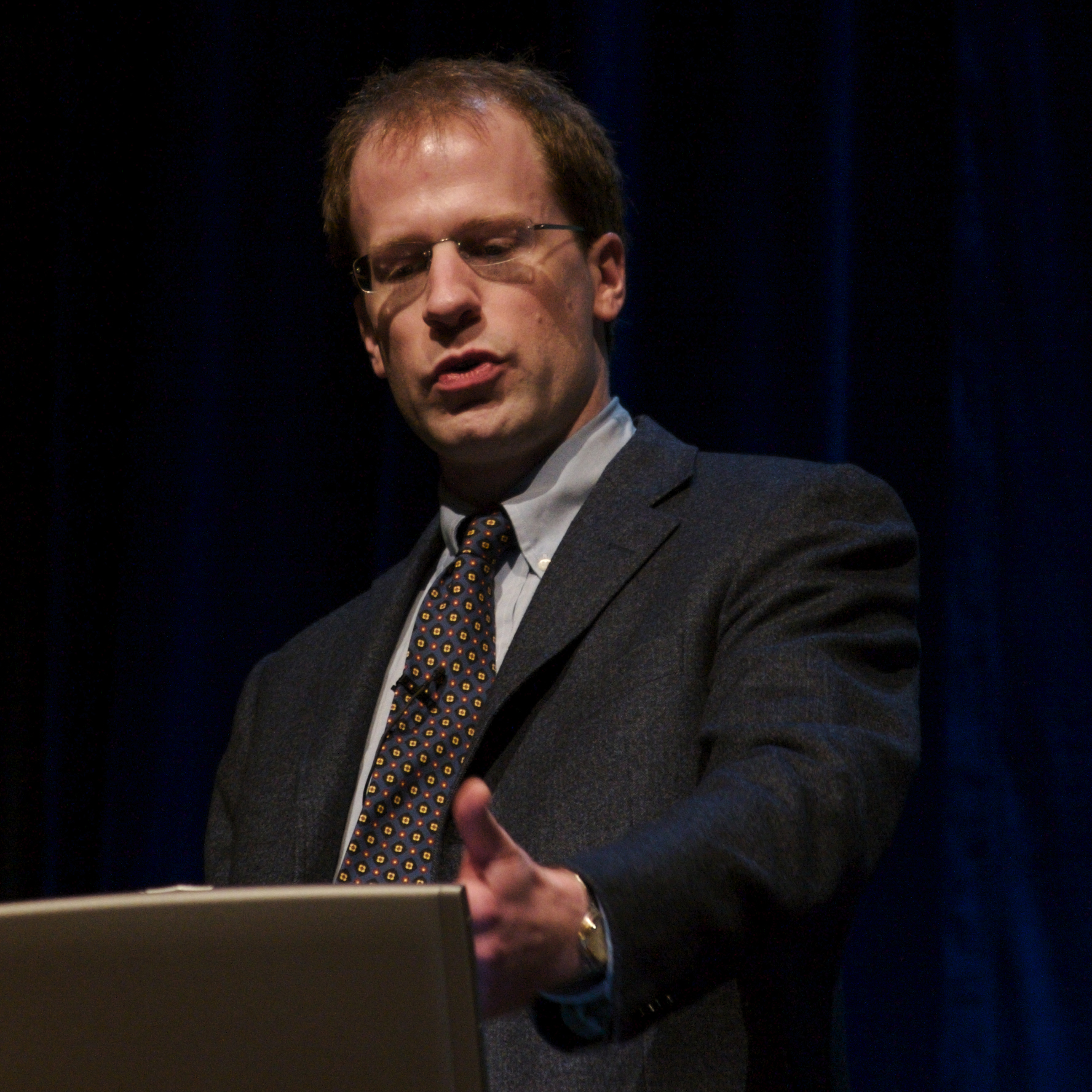
Nick Bostrom, transhumanist and bioconservatism detractor

Nick Bostrom argues that bioconservative concerns regarding the threat of transhumanism to posthuman dignity are unsubstantiated. Bostrom himself identifies with forms of posthuman dignity, and in his article In Defence of Posthuman Dignity, argues that such does not run in contradiction with the ideals of transhumanism.

Bostrom argues in the article that Fukuyama's concerns about the threats transhumanism pose to dignity as moral status—that transhumanism might strip away humanity's inalienable right of respect—lacks empirical evidence. He states that the proportion of people given full moral respect in Western societies has actually increased through history. This increase includes such populations as non-whites, women and non-property owners. Following this logic, it will similarly be feasible to incorporate future posthumans without compensating the dignities of the rest of the population.

Bostrom then goes on to discuss dignity in the sense of moral worthiness, which varies among individuals. He suggests that posthumans can similarly possess dignity in this sense. Further, he suggests, it is possible that posthumans, being genetically enhanced, may come to possess even higher levels of moral excellence than contemporary human beings. While he considers that certain posthumans may live more degraded lives as a result of self-enhancement, he also notes that even at this time many people are not living worthy lives either. He finds this regrettable and suggests that countermeasures as education and cultural reforms can be helpful in curtailing such practices. Bostrom supports the morphological and reproductive freedoms of human beings, suggesting that ultimately, leading whatever life one aspires should be an unalienable right.

Reproductive freedom means that parents should be free to choose the technological enhancements they want when having a child. According to Bostrom, there is no reason to prefer the random processes of nature over human design. He dismisses claims that describe this kind of operations as "tyranny" of the parents over their future children. In his opinion, the tyranny of nature is no different. In fact, he claims that "Had Mother Nature been a real parent, she would have been in jail for child abuse and murder."

Earlier in the paper, Bostrom also replies to Leon Kass with the claim that, in his words, "nature's gifts are sometimes poisoned and should not always be accepted." He makes the point that nature cannot be relied upon for normative standards. Instead, he suggests that transhumanism can, over time, allow for the technical improvement of "human nature," consistent with our widely held societal morals.

According to Bostrom, the way that bioconservatives justify banning certain human enhancements while not others, reveal the double standard that is present in this line of thought. For him, a misleading conception of human dignity is to blame for this. According to him, humanity mistakenly takes for granted that human nature is an intrinsic, unmodifiable set of properties. This problem, he argues, is overcome when human nature is conceived as 'dynamic, partially human-made, and improvable.' If it is acknowledged that social and technological factors influence human nature, then dignity 'consists in what we are and what we have the potential to become, not in our pedigree or social origin'. It can be seen, then, that improved capabilities does not affect moral status, and that humanity should sustain an inclusive view that recognizes enhanced descendants as possessors of dignity. Transhumanists reject the notion that there is a significant moral difference between enhancing human lives through technological means compared to other methods.

Distinguishing between types of enhancement

Bostrom discusses a criticism leveled against transhumanists by bioconservatives, that children who are biologically enhanced by certain kinds of technologies will face psychological anguish because of the enhancement.

1. Prenatal enhancements may create expectations for the individual's future traits or behaviour.
2. If the individual learns of these enhancements, this is likely to cause them psychological anguish stemming from pressure to fulfil such expectations.
3. Actions which are likely to cause individuals psychological anguish are undesirable to the point of being morally reprehensible.
4. Therefore, prenatal enhancements are morally reprehensible.

Bostrom finds that bioconservatives rely on a false dichotomy between technological enhancements that are harmful and those that are not, thus challenging premise two. Bostrom argues that children whose mothers played Mozart to them in the womb would not face psychological anguish upon discovering that their musical talents had been "prenatally programmed by her parents." However, he finds that bioconservative writers often employ analogous arguments to the contrary demonstrating that technological enhancements, rather than playing Mozart in the womb, could potentially disturb children.

== Notable bioconservatives ==
- George Annas
- Dale Carrico
- Francis Fukuyama (as attributed by observers)
- Leon Kass
- Bill McKibben
- Oliver O'Donovan
- Jeremy Rifkin
- Wesley Smith
- Michael Sandel
- Edmund Pellegrino

== See also ==
- Bioluddism
- Posthumanization
- Techno-progressivism
- Appeal to nature
