= Humanity+ =

International non-profit organization

- Formation: 1998; 28 years ago
- Executive Director: Natasha Vita-More
- Website: www.humanityplus.org

Humanity+ (also Humanity Plus; formerly the World Transhumanist Association) is a non-profit international educational organization that advocates the ethical use of technologies and evidence-based science to improve the human condition.

== History ==
Humanity+, Inc. originated as an organization under the name World Transhumanist Association. In 1998, the World Transhumanist Association (WTA) was founded by Nick Bostrom and David Pearce. In 2002, it was incorporated as a 501(c)(3) non-profit corporation.

At its inception, WTA officials considered that social forces could undermine their futurist visions and needed to be addressed. A particular concern is the equal access to human enhancement technologies across classes and borders. In 2006, William Saletan reported that a political struggle within the World Transhumanist Association had erupted in 2004 largely between the libertarian right and the liberal left, resulting in a centre-left-leaning position that continued to polarize politics under its former executive director James Hughes. In its mission statement as of 2025, Humanity+ rejects anthropocentrism.

== Advisors and members ==
- Sonia Arrison
- Nick Bostrom
- George Dvorsky
- Patri Friedman
- Linda MacDonald Glenn
- Ben Goertzel
- Aubrey de Grey
- Todd Huffman
- James Hughes
- Max More
- David Pearce
- Giulio Prisco
- Martine Rothblatt
- R. U. Sirius
- Giuseppe Vatinno
- Natasha Vita-More
- Mark Alan Walker
