= Jan Roelfs =

Production designer (born 1957)

Jan Roelfs (born 1957 in Amsterdam) is a production designer of Dutch descent. Roelfs was nominated for an Academy Award for Best Art Direction twice for the 1992 film Orlando and for the 1997 film Gattaca. He shared the Orlando nomination with fellow production designer Ben Van Os and the Gattaca nomination with set decorator Nancy Nye. Roelfs also worked as an art director in the 1980s and the 1990s.

== Filmography ==
- Het bittere kruid (1985) – art director
- In de schaduw van de overwinning (1986) – production designer
- A Zed & Two Noughts (1986) – production designer
- Havinck (1987) – art director
- Drowning by Numbers (1988) – production designer
- Shadowman (1988) – art director
- The Cook the Thief His Wife & Her Lover (1989) – production designer
- Laura Ley (1989) – art director
- Leedvermaak (1989) – art director
- Sailors Don't Cry (1990) – art director
- Eline Vere (1991) – art director, production designer
- Prospero's Books (1991) – production designer
- Orlando (1992) – production designer
- Dark Blood (1993) – production designer
- The Baby of Mâcon (1993) – production designer
- 1000 Rosen (1994) – art director, production designer
- Little Women (1994) – production designer
- Gentlemen Don't Eat Poets (1995) – production designer
- The Juror (1996) – production designer
- Gattaca (1997) – production designer
- The Astronaut's Wife (1999) – production designer
- Flawless (1999) – production designer
- Bad Company (2002) – production designer
- S1m0ne (2002) – production designer
- Alexander (2004) – production designer
- World Trade Center (2006) – production designer
- The Hunting Party (2007) – production designer
- Lions for Lambs (2007) – production designer
- The Lucky Ones (2008) – production designer
- My Own Love Song (2010) – production designer
- Get Him to the Greek (2010) – production designer
- 47 Ronin (2013) – production designer
- Ghost in the Shell (2017) - production designer
