= Giulio Prisco =

Italian computer scientist

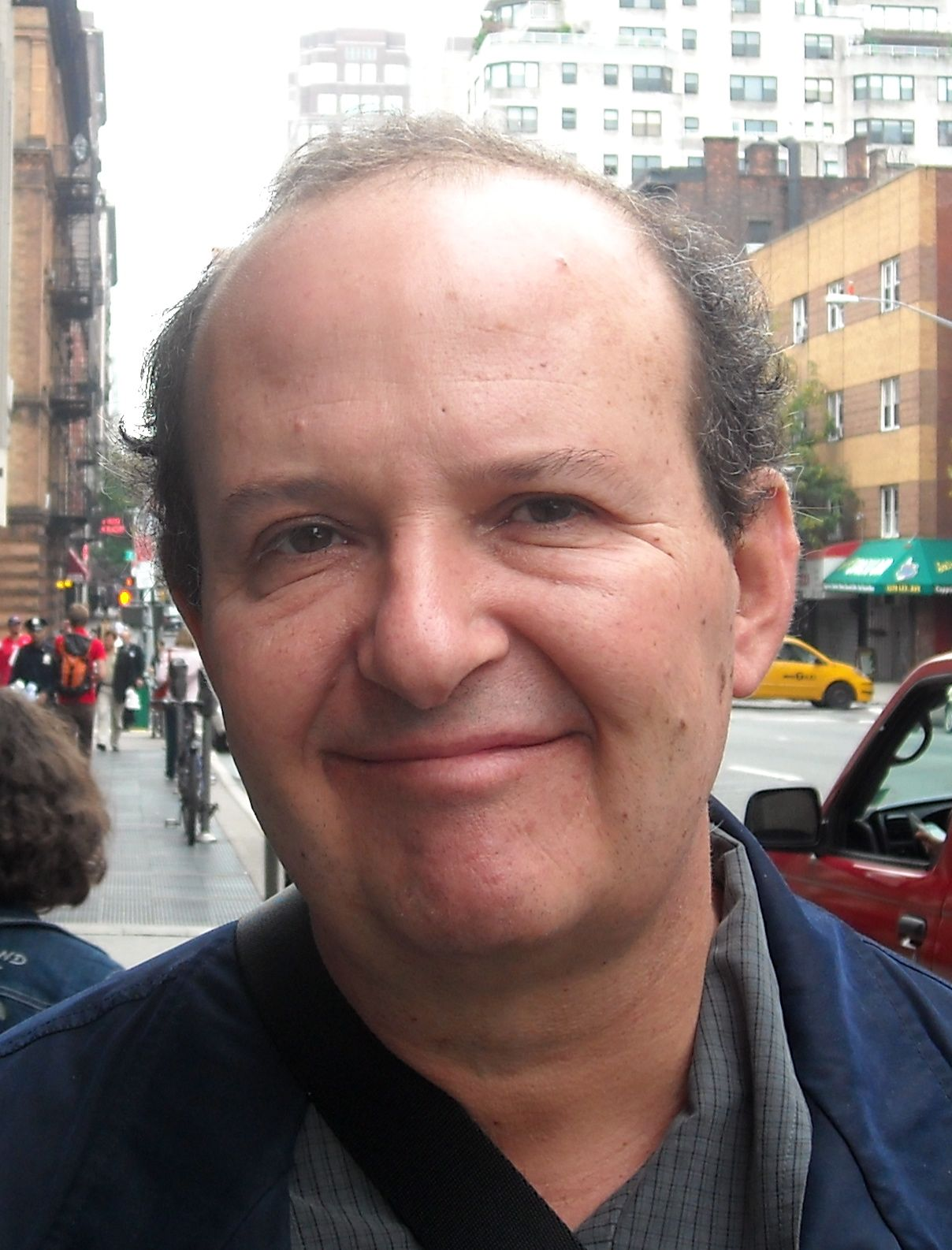
- Giulio Prisco, picture by David Orban
- Born: 1957 (age 68–69); Naples, Italy
- Occupations: Information technology consultant, virtual reality consultant, writer, futurist, transhumanist, cosmist
- Known for: Advocacy of cryonics, contributions to transhumanism

Giulio Prisco (born in Naples in 1957) is an Italian information technology and virtual reality consultant; as well as a writer, futurist, transhumanist, and cosmist. He is an advocate of cryonics and contributes to the science and technology online magazine Tendencias21. He produced teleXLR8, an online talk program using virtual reality and video conferencing, and focused on highly imaginative science and technology. He writes and speaks on a wide range of topics, including science, information technology, emerging technologies, virtual worlds, space exploration and futurology.

Prisco's ideas on virtual realities, technological immortality, mind uploading, and new scientific religions are extensively featured in the OUP books Apocalyptic AI - Visions of Heaven in Robotics, Artificial Intelligence, and Virtual Reality by Robert M. Geraci and Virtually Sacred - Myth and Meaning in World of Warcraft and Second Life by the same author.

Prisco's ideas are also extensively featured in the 2017 book Dynamic Secularization - Information Technology and the Tension Between Religion and Science by William Sims Bainbridge and the 2019 book Transhumanism - Engineering the Human Condition: History, Philosophy and Current Status by Roberto Manzocco, both published by Springer.

Formerly a researcher at CERN, a staff member at the European Space Agency, and a senior manager at the European Union Satellite Centre, Prisco is a physicist and computer scientist. He served as a member on the board of directors of World Transhumanist Association, of which he was the executive director, and the board of directors of the Institute for Ethics and Emerging Technologies, from which he resigned in 2021. He is currently the president of the Associazione Italiana Transumanisti. He is also a founding member of the Order of Cosmic Engineers, and the Turing Church, fledgling organizations which claim that the benefits of a technological singularity, which would come from accelerating change, should or would be viable alternatives to the promises of major religious groups.

Prisco has been repeatedly at odds with technocritic Dale Carrico who argues that transhumanism is technological utopianism turned into a new religious movement. Prisco agrees but counters that transhumanism is an “unreligion” because it offers many of the benefits of religion without its drawbacks.

== Published works ==
=== Books ===
Prisco has published two books. The first, published in 2018 and again in 2020 with its second edition, is titled "Tales of the Turing Church: Hacking religion, enlightening science, awakening technology". The second book, published in 2021, is titled Futurist spaceflight meditations.

=== Book chapters ===
Prisco has also written the chapter "Transcendent Engineering" for the 2013 book The Transhumanist Reader: Classical and Contemporary Essays on the Science, Technology, and Philosophy of the Human Future and the chapter "Future Evolution of Virtual Worlds as Communication Environments" in the 2010 Springer book Online Worlds: Convergence of the Real and the Virtual.
