= Cognitive liberty =

Freedom of an individual to control their own mental processes

Cognitive liberty, or the "right to mental self-determination", is the freedom of an individual to control their own mental processes, cognition, and consciousness. Scholars have argued that it is both an extension of the right to freedom of thought and a principle that helps explain it. Although the term is relatively recent, many theorists argue that cognitive liberty is becoming increasingly important. Advances in neuroscience and related technologies have expanded the ability to monitor or influence consciousness. Cognitive liberty is not recognized as a distinct right in any international human rights treaties, though the concept has been discussed in some United States legal and academic contexts.

== Overview ==
The term "cognitive liberty" was coined by neuroethicist Wrye Sententia and legal theorist and lawyer Richard Glen Boire, the founders and directors of the non-profit Center for Cognitive Liberty and Ethics (CCLE). Sententia and Boire define cognitive liberty as "the right of each individual to think independently and autonomously, to use the full power of his or her mind, and to engage in multiple modes of thought."

The CCLE is a network of scholars who study issues related to the protection of freedom of thought and emerging neurotechnologies. They seek to develop public policies that will preserve and enhance freedom of thought, and offer guidance with regard to relevant developments in neurotechnology, psychopharmacology, cognitive sciences and law.

Sententia and Boire developed the concept in response to the growing ability of technology to monitor and influence cognitive function, and the corresponding increase in the need to ensure individual cognitive autonomy and privacy. Sententia divides the practical application of cognitive liberty into two principles:

1. Individuals should not be compelled to use technologies that directly interact with the brain or to take psychoactive drugs, provided they do not endanger others.
2. Individuals should not be prohibited from using mind-altering or mind-enhancing drugs and technologies, as long as their use does not harm others.

Supporters note that these two principles resemble Timothy Leary's "Two Commandments for the Molecular Age", from his 1968 book The Politics of Ecstasy:

1. Thou shalt not alter the consciousness of thy fellow man
2. Thou shalt not prevent thy fellow man from altering his own consciousness.

Supporters of cognitive liberty therefore seek to impose both a negative and a positive obligation on states: to refrain from non-consensually interfering with an individual's cognitive processes, and to allow individuals to self-determine their own "inner realm" and control their own mental functions.

=== Freedom from interference ===
This first obligation—refraining from non-consensual interference with an individual’s cognitive processes—aims to prevent a person’s mental states from being altered or monitored without their knowledge or consent. Advocates describe this as "setting up a defensive wall against unwanted intrusions". Advances in neurotechnologies—such as transcranial magnetic stimulation and electroencephalography (or "brain fingerprinting")—as well as in pharmacology, including selective serotonin reuptake inhibitors (SSRIs), nootropics, modafinil and other psychoactive drugs, have increased the ability to monitor and directly influence human cognition. As a result, many theorists have emphasized the importance of recognizing cognitive liberty in order to protect individuals from the state using such technologies to alter those individuals' mental processes: "states must be barred from invading the inner sphere of persons, from accessing their thoughts, modulating their emotions or manipulating their personal preferences." These specific ethical concerns regarding the use of neuroscience technologies to interfere or invade the brain form the fields of neuroethics and neuroprivacy.

This element of cognitive liberty has been raised in relation to a number of state-sanctioned interventions in individual cognition, from the mandatory psychiatric 'treatment' of homosexuals in the US before the 1970s, to the non-consensual administration of psychoactive drugs to unwitting US citizens during CIA Project MKUltra, to the forcible administration of mind-altering drugs on individuals to make them competent to stand trial. Futurist and bioethicist George Dvorsky, chair of the Board of the Institute for Ethics and Emerging Technologies has identified this element of cognitive liberty as being of relevance to the debate around the curing of autism spectrum conditions. Duke University School of Law Professor Nita A. Farahany has proposed legislative protections for cognitive liberty as a way to strengthen the Fifth Amendment right against self-incrimination. She argues that emerging technologies capable of accessing human memory heighten the need for such safeguards.”. She explores these issues in her book 'The Battle for Your Brain: Defending the Right to Think Freely in the Age of Neurotechnology.'

Though this element of cognitive liberty is often defined as an individual's freedom from state interference with human cognition, Jan Christoph Bublitz and Reinhard Merkel among others suggest that cognitive liberty should also prevent other, non-state entities from interfering with an individual's mental "inner realm". Bublitz and Merkel propose the introduction of a new criminal offense punishing "interventions severely interfering with another's mental integrity by undermining mental control or exploiting pre-existing mental weakness." They argue that direct interventions that diminish cognitive capacities such as memory, concentration, or willpower; alter a person’s preferences or beliefs; provoke inappropriate emotional responses; or cause clinically identifiable mental harm should be considered prima facie impermissible and subject to criminal prosecution. Sententia and Boire have also expressed concern that corporations and other non-state entities might utilize emerging neurotechnologies to alter individuals' mental processes without their consent.

=== Freedom to self-determine ===
The first obligation focuses on protecting individuals from unwanted interference by the state, corporations, or other parties. The second obligation emphasizes the freedom to act autonomously, ensuring that people can alter or enhance their own consciousness. Individuals exercising this aspect of cognitive liberty may change their mental states using indirect methods such as meditation, yoga or prayer, or through direct cognitive intervention through psychoactive drugs or neurotechnology.

As psychotropic drugs are a powerful method of altering cognitive function, many advocates of cognitive liberty are also advocates of drug law reform, claiming that the "war on drugs" is in fact a "war on mental states". The CCLE and other advocacy organizations, such as Cognitive Liberty UK, have called for the re-examination and reform of laws restricting the use of certain psychoactive substances. According to the CCLE, a key guiding principle is that "governments should not criminally prohibit cognitive enhancement or the experience of any mental state". Advocates have also invoked cognitive liberty in calls to revise restrictions on prescription cognitive-enhancement drugs (also called smart drugs or nootropics) such as Prozac, Ritalin and Adderall.

This element of cognitive liberty is also of great importance to proponents of the transhumanist movement, a key tenet of which is the enhancement of human mental function. Wrye Sententia has emphasized the importance of cognitive liberty in ensuring the freedom to pursue human mental enhancement, as well as the freedom to choose against enhancement. Sententia argues that the recognition of a "right to (and not to) direct, modify, or enhance one's thought processes" is vital to the free application of emerging neurotechnology to enhance human cognition and that something beyond the current conception of freedom of thought is needed. Sententia claims that "cognitive liberty's strength is that it protects those who do want to alter their brains, but also those who do not".

=== Artificial Intelligence ===
In the context of AI, cognitive liberty is increasingly discussed in relation to AI systems that influence perception, attention, decision-making, and emotional responses. Scholars and policy analysts have raised concerns that the widespread deployment of such systems, particularly when they are designed to personalize, predict, or shape behavior at scale, and how they may affect individuals’ ability to form independent thoughts and preferences, particularly in the absence of specific legal obligations. In a 2025 article published in The Humanist, scholar Magda Romanska explores how emerging AI systems may challenge individuals’ mental autonomy and privacy. She focuses in particular on technologies related to affective computing and automated decision-making. The article argues that as AI begins to interpret, predict, or manipulate human emotion, it raises new concerns for cognitive liberty—especially regarding who has access to emotional data and how it is used in social, legal, or institutional settings. In the context of generative and agentic AI, scholar and journalist Courtney Radsch proposes that corporate concentration of AI pose risks to cognitive liberty since business models optimized for engagement and behavioral prediction may conflict with protections for mental autonomy, leading to proposals that include fiduciary-style obligations, competition policy interventions, and human rights–based approaches.

== Relationship with recognized human rights ==
Cognitive liberty is not currently recognized as a human right by any international human rights treaty. By contrast, freedom of thought is recognized in Article 18 of the Universal Declaration of Human Rights (UDHR), freedom of thought can be distinguished from cognitive liberty in that the former is concerned with protecting an individual's freedom to think whatever they want, whereas cognitive liberty is concerned with protecting an individual's freedom to think however they want. Cognitive liberty seeks to protect an individual's right to determine their own state of mind and be free from external control over their state of mind, rather than just protecting the content of an individual's thoughts. Some scholars suggest that earlier human rights instruments did not address cognitive liberty because, at the time they were drafted, technologies capable of directly interfering with mental autonomy did not yet exist. As the human mind was considered invulnerable to direct manipulation, control or alteration, it was deemed unnecessary to expressly protect individuals from unwanted mental interference. With modern advances in neuroscience and in anticipation of its future development however, it is argued that such express protection is becoming increasingly necessary.

Some commentators describe cognitive liberty as an expansion of the traditional understanding of the right to freedom of thought. Freedom of thought should now be understood to include the right to determine one's own mental state as well as the content of one's thoughts. Others argue that cognitive liberty is already inherent in the international human rights framework, serving as a principle that underlies the rights to freedom of thought, expression, and religion. The freedom to think in whatever manner one chooses is a "necessary precondition to those guaranteed freedoms." Daniel Waterman and Casey William Hardison have argued that cognitive liberty is fundamental to Freedom of Thought because it encompasses the ability to have certain types of experiences, including the right to experience altered or non-ordinary states of consciousness. It has also been suggested that cognitive liberty can be seen to be a part of the inherent dignity of human beings as recognized by Article 1 of the UDHR.

Most proponents of cognitive liberty agree, however, that cognitive liberty should be expressly recognized as a human right in order to properly provide protection for individual cognitive autonomy.

At least one scholar and proponent of cognitive liberty, Christoph Bublitz, has used the term 'freedom of mind' to describe cognitive liberty: "mind altering interventions primary affect another sense of freedom, freedom of mind, a concept that has not received much attention although it should rank among the most important legal and political freedoms…This freedom is not often regarded in its own right but should be recognized and more fully developed in face of emerging mind-altering technologies…Freedom of mind is the freedom of a person to use her mental capacities as she pleases, free from external interferences and internal impediments".

== Legal recognition ==
=== In the United States ===
Richard Glen Boire of the Center for Cognitive Liberty and Ethics filed an amicus brief with the US Supreme Court in the case of Sell v. United States, in which the Supreme Court examined whether the court had the power to make an order to forcibly administer antipsychotic medication to an individual who had refused such treatment, for the sole purpose of making them competent to stand trial.

=== In the United Kingdom ===
In the case of R v Hardison, the defendant, charged with eight counts under the Misuse of Drugs Act 1971 (MDA), including the production of DMT and LSD, claimed that cognitive liberty was safeguarded by Article 9 of the European Convention on Human Rights. Hardison argued that "individual sovereignty over one's interior environment constitutes the very core of what it means to be free", and that as psychotropic drugs are a potent method of altering an individual's mental process, prohibition of them under the MDA was in opposition to Article 9. The court however disagreed, calling Hardison's arguments a "portmanteau defense" and relying upon the UN Drug Conventions and the earlier case of R v Taylor to deny Hardison's right to appeal to a superior court. Hardison was convicted and given a 20-year prison sentence, though he was released on 29 May 2013 after nine years in prison.

== Criticism ==
The recent development of neurosciences is increasing the possibility of controlling and influence specific mental functions. The risks inherent in removing restrictions on controlled cognitive-enhancing drugs, including of widening the gap between those able to afford such treatments and those unable to do so, have caused many to remain skeptical about the wisdom of recognizing cognitive liberty as a right. Political philosopher and Harvard University professor Michael J. Sandel, when examining the prospect of memory enhancement, wrote that "some who worry about the ethics of cognitive enhancement point to the danger of creating two classes of human beings – those with access to enhancement technologies, and those who must make do with an unaltered memory that fades with age."

== See also ==
- Artificial intelligence and elections
- Cognitive ergonomics
- Cosmetic pharmacology
- Drug liberalization
- Morphological freedom
- Neuroenhancement
- Neuroethics
- Neurolaw
- Personalized medicine
- Psychonautics
- Responsible drug use
- The Rhetoric of Drugs – 1990 work by Jacques Derrida
- Self-ownership
- Techno-progressivism
- Thomas Szasz
