= Moral enhancement =

Use of biotechnology to improve one's character

Moral enhancement (abbreviated ME), also called moral bioenhancement (abbreviated MBE), is the use of biomedical technology to morally improve individuals. MBE is a growing topic in neuroethics, a field developing the ethics of neuroscience as well as the neuroscience of ethics. After Thomas Douglas introduced the concept of MBE in 2008, its merits have been widely debated in academic bioethics literature. Since then, Ingmar Persson and Julian Savulescu have been among the most vocal MBE supporters. Much of the debate over MBE has focused on Persson and Savulescu's 2012 book in support of it, Unfit for the Future? The Need for Moral Enhancement.

== Different kinds of moral enhancement ==
Moral enhancement in general is sometimes distinguished from MBE specifically, such that ME includes any means of moral improvement while MBE only involves biomedical interventions. Some also distinguish invasive from non-invasive, intended from resultant, treatment-focused from enhancement-focused, capability-improving from behavior-improving, and passive from active ME interventions. Vojin Rakić has distinguished involuntary (such as for the unborn) from compulsory and voluntary MBE, claiming that compulsory MBE is not justifiable and proposing that "a combination of [voluntary MBE] and [involuntary MBE] might be the best option humans have to become better". Parker Crutchfield has argued in favor of covert and compulsory use of ME upon unsuspecting populations. Other thinkers have argued in favor of a partial or limited form of MBE such as 'indirect enhancement' or 'moral supplementation' while rejecting more comprehensive forms of MBE as undesirable or unachievable.

== Arguments in favour ==
The simplest argument for MBE is definitional: improving moral character is morally good, so all else being equal, any biomedical treatment that actually improves moral character does moral good.

Douglas originally suggested MBE as a counter-example to what he calls the "bioconservative thesis," which claims that human enhancement is immoral even if it is feasible. He argues that enhancements to improve someone’s moral motivations would at least be morally permissible. For example, he cites enhancements to reduce "counter-moral" racist and aggressive emotional reactions as morally permissible because they remove impediments to morality.

In 2009, Mark Alan Walker proposed a "Genetic Virtue Project" (GVP) to genetically enhance moral traits. Given that personality traits are heritable, and some traits are moral while others are immoral, he suggests increasing moral traits while reducing immoral ones through genetic engineering.

=== Companions in innocence ===
Walker argues for the GVP based on what he calls a ‘‘companions in innocence’’ strategy, which says that “any objection raised against the GVP has an analogue in socialization and educational efforts. Since such objections are not understood as decisive against nurturing attempts, they should not be considered decisive against the GVP.” In other words, any objection to MBE which also applies to traditional moral education has reduced itself to absurdity, because few would argue that teaching someone to be moral is inherently objectionable.

Several other MBE proponents have cited moral education as an example of socially accepted non-biomedical moral enhancement. For example, Douglas calls it “intuitively clear” that any given person has a reason to undergo moral self-enhancement by reducing counter-moral emotions through self-reflection. Douglas says that at least some of the intuitive reasons that anyone should become morally better through self-reflection, like increasing concern for others or good consequences, apply to voluntary MBE.

=== Unfit for the Future ===
Based on the fact that human technological progress has advanced faster than human moral psychology can adapt through evolution, Persson and Savulescu point out that humans' capability to cause large-scale destruction has increased exponentially. However, given that humans tend to care only about their immediate acquaintances and circumstances instead of thinking on a larger scale, they are vulnerable to tragedies of the commons like climate change and to technologies like nuclear weapons which may pose an existential threat to humanity.

Given that moral education and liberal democracy are insufficient, MBE is needed at least as a supplementary method to solve these problems. Persson and Savulescu's argument relies on the notion that it is much easier to cause great harm than it is to cause goodness to an equal extent. Because of the human population size there will inevitably be a fraction of humanity which is immoral enough to desire to inflict this great harm. Persson and Savulescu conclude that the intervention of extensive human moral enhancement is a necessary component to address this threat.

== Criticism ==
Central issues debated in literature about MBE include whether there is an urgent need for it, if a sufficient consensus on the definition of morality is achievable, technically feasible and ethically permissible interventions to carry out MBE, the ability to ensure no violation of consent in those interventions, and the ability to ensure no harmful social side-effects that they produce.

=== The Freedom to Fall ===
John Harris criticised moral enhancement on the grounds of 'The Freedom to Fall'. His principal argument is that moral enhancement is wrong because it restricts one's freedom to do wrong, making it impossible to act immorally, thus undermining their autonomy. Harris referred to Book III of Milton's Paradise Lost, in which Milton reported God saying, 'Sufficient to have stood, though free to fall.' Harris believed that one should hang on to their freedom to fall. Without it, one is unable to discern right from wrong, taking away both freedom and virtue. Harris asserted that there is no virtue involved in performing activities that one is instructed to.

There are two further criticisms of moral enhancement. First, the distinction between right and wrong is highly context-dependent. For example, in the case of self-defense, harming another person can potentially be morally justifiable, as it might be the best compromise of welfare. Harris suggested that it is unclear whether MBE would be nuanced enough to take such situations into account. Second, he pointed out that there is an element of value judgement when one makes a choice between 'right' and 'wrong', and he said that people are entitled to willingly make the wrong choices. This would not be possible with MBE, which compromises this 'freedom to fall.'

Harris advocates science, innovation and knowledge — particularly in the form of education — as possible solutions to the possibility of mass destruction. Again, he refers to Milton, in particular the power of freedom and sense of justice installed within subjective selves. Most importantly, the roles of freedom and autonomy entails that one cannot have the sufficiency to stand without the freedom to fall.

==== Replies ====
Harris's "Freedom to Fall" has been widely criticized by MBE proponents, who have argued that MBE is benign to freedom and can sometimes increase freedom. Freely chosen moral enhancement is no threat to freedom, as described by Vojin Rakić. By reducing biases that impair moral judgement, Thomas Douglas argues, MBE can remove constraints on the ability to be moral. This does not take away anyone's freedom to be immoral. Instead, it simply grants them more freedom to be moral. Similarly, Persson and Savulescu point out that increasing someone's motivation to act rightly for the right reasons makes them no less free than "the garden-variety virtuous person" who already has that motivation.

Several MBE proponents have pointed out that Harris's "Freedom to Fall" assumes the controversial view that if someone's actions are fully determined by previous causes, then that person cannot act freely. If anyone can be free to act one way when they will certainly act another way, then MBE can cause moral improvement without taking away any valuable freedom. Most philosophers believe that free will is compatible with determinism in this way. If they are right, then MBE can improve moral behavior without affecting anyone's freedom.

=== Sufficiency of non-biomedical methods ===
Terri Murray disputes the claim by Persson and Savulescu that political will and moral education are insufficient to ensure that people will behave responsibly, claiming that Persson and Savulescu unjustly reify moral dispositions in biology. Murray argues that political and social pressure are sufficient to improve behavior, explaining that although certain Islamic countries state that women should be forced to wear the burka and stay indoors because men cannot control their sexual urges, this is shown to be false by men in Western countries, both Muslim or otherwise, exercising their ability to control their sexual urges. She explained that this is due to the deterrent effect of both laws and social pressure:

"The truth is that there is a political will to treat women as equals in the West that is apparently absent from countries governed by Islamic law. What Savulescu and Persson do is to similarly treat the will not to be moral on a larger scale as though it were an inevitable and natural part of human biology rather than a political and cultural choice."

=== Ethical basis of moral enhancement ===
Since the nature of morality has historically caused wide disagreements, several authors have questioned whether it is possible to come up with a sufficiently widely accepted ethical basis for MBE, especially with respect to what qualities should be enhanced. Joao Fabiano argues that attempting to produce a full account of morality in order to enable moral enhancement would be "both impractical and arguably risky". Fabiano also suggests that "we seem to be far away from such an account" and notes that 'the inability for prior large-cooperation" plays a role in this.

==== Replies ====
Although there are a wide variety of disagreeing ethical systems, David DeGrazia argues, there are “points of overlapping consensus among competing, reasonable moral perspectives.” Traditional moral education generally teaches children to stay within that consensus. DeGrazia’s idea of this overlapping consensus includes disapproval of antisocial personality disorder, sadism, some kinds of moral cynicism, defective empathy, out-group prejudice, inability to face unpleasant realities, weak will, impulsivity, lack of nuance in moral understanding, and inability to compromise. Biomedically reducing these traits would, per DeGrazia’s reasoning, count as moral enhancement from these “reasonable moral perspectives.”

=== Other issues ===
MBE proponents have been accused of being too speculative, overstating the capabilities of future interventions and describing unrealistic scenarios like enhancing "all of humanity." One literature review assesses the evidence on seven interventions cited by MBE proponents, saying that none works well enough to be practically feasible. Furthermore, there is some doubt that any drugs for moral enhancement will soon be introduced to the market. Nick Bostrom highlighted that the way medical research is conducted and drugs approved impedes the development of enhancement drugs. A drug must demonstrably treat a specific disease to be approved, Bostrom said, but the traits or behaviors targeted for MBE arguably cannot be viewed as diseases. Bostrom concludes that any drug that has an enhancing effect "in healthy subjects is a serendipitous unintended benefit". He suggests that the current disease-focused medical model needs to be changed, otherwise enhancement drugs could not be researched well and introduced to the market. Along with this feasibility objection, he notes that public funding for enhancement drugs research projects is currently very limited.

Other authors have suggested that unless MBE is based on an individual's choice, it cannot truly be called "moral" enhancement because personal choice is the basis of ethics. Murray argues that the idea that biological enhancement can make us morally good "undermines our understanding of moral goodness." She argues that MBE allows for "paternalistic interventions" from medical experts to "redirect the individual's behaviour to conform to their or society's 'best interests."

Ram-Tiktin suggests that if MBE is more effective for enhancing people that are already moral, then it could further the gap between moral and immoral people, exacerbating social inequality. Also, if MBE makes some people morally better, it could unfairly raise the moral standards for everyone else.

Fukuyama points out that, while the concept of being able to do away with negative emotions is appealing in theory, if we did not have the emotion of aggression then "we wouldn’t be able to defend ourselves".

== See also ==
- Key issues in neuroethics
- Human enhancement
- Cognitive enhancement
- Transhumanism
