= Ronald Bailey (writer) =

American libertarian science writer (born 1953)

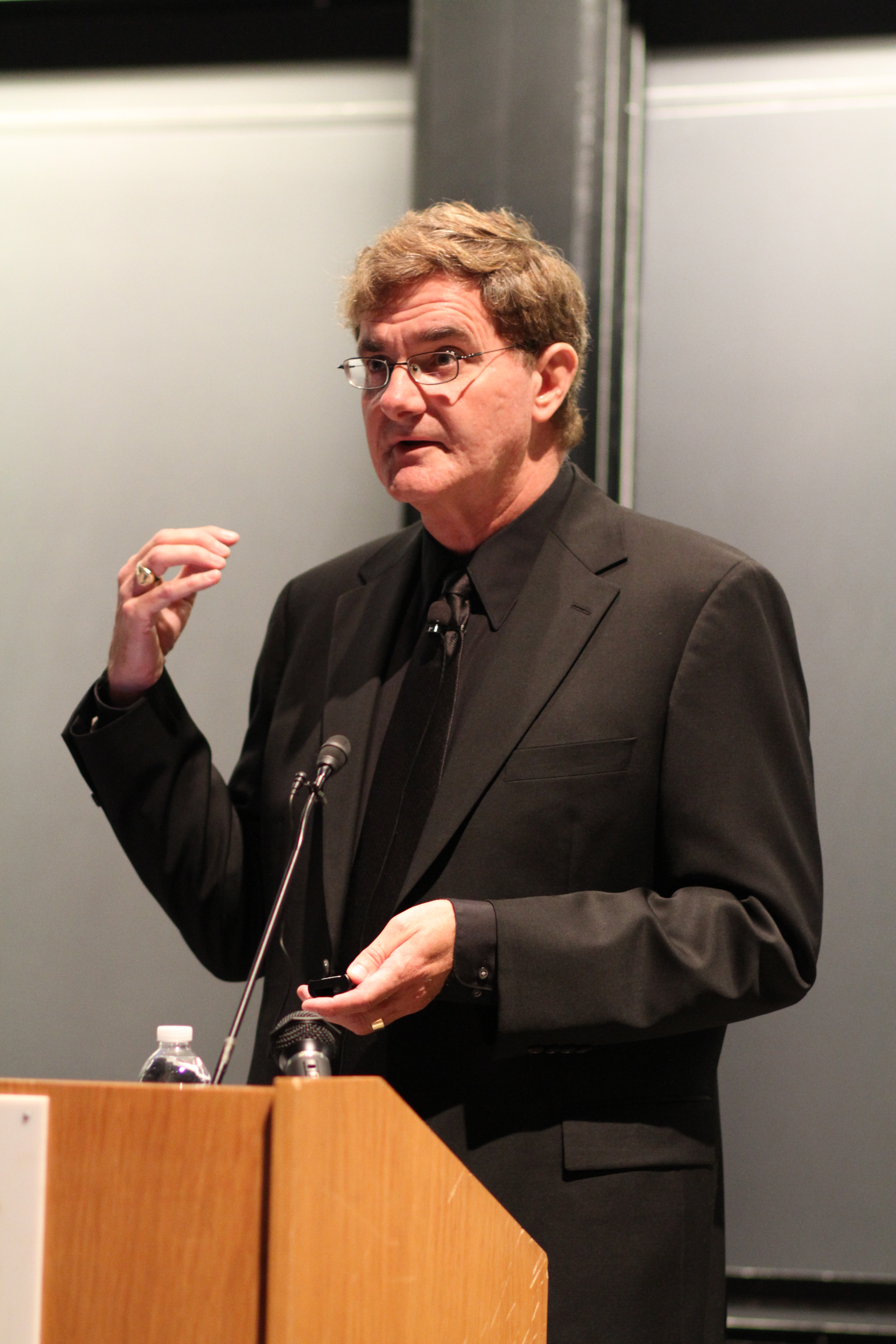
- Bailey in 2010
- Born: November 23, 1953 (age 72); San Antonio, Texas, US
- Occupations: Writer, editor

Ronald Bailey (born November 23, 1953) is an American libertarian science writer. He has written and edited several books on economics, ecology, and biotechnology.

== Personal life ==
Bailey was born on November 23, 1953, in San Antonio, and raised in Washington County, Virginia. He lives in Washington, D.C., and Charlottesville, Virginia, with his wife Pamela.

Bailey voted for George W. Bush in both 2000 and 2004, a fact which he later wrote made him "disheartened and ashamed". In 2008, he voted for Barack Obama because he felt that "[t]he Republicans must be punished and punished hard".

== Career ==
Bailey attended the University of Virginia, where he earned a B.A. in philosophy and economics in 1976. He worked briefly as an economist for the Federal Energy Regulatory Commission. From 1987 to 1990 he contributed articles to Forbes. Bailey worked as a reporter for The Tico Times in San José, Costa Rica during 1990 and 1991. His articles and reviews have appeared in national newspapers and magazines and have been selected for inclusion in The Best American Science Writing anthology series. Bailey was the founding producer of the PBS series Think Tank and has produced or co-produced several series and documentaries for PBS television and ABC News. Since 1997 he has been a science correspondent for Reason magazine. Bailey was the 1993 Warren T. Brookes Fellow in Environmental Journalism at the Competitive Enterprise Institute (CEI).

He has lectured at Harvard University, Rutgers University, McGill University, University of Alaska, Université du Québec, the Cato Institute, the Instituto de Libertad y Desarrollo (Chile), and the American Enterprise Institute. A column he wrote in 2004, "The battle for your brain" received a Southern California Journalism award from the Los Angeles Press Club and was included in the book, The Best of American Science and Nature Writing 2004. Bailey testified before a congressional sub-committee in 2004 on, "The Impact of Science on Public Policy". In 2006 he was on the shortlist of nominees of "personalities who have made the most significant contributions to biotech in the last ten years" compiled by the editors of Nature Biotechnology.

== Work ==
In 1989, in an article in Forbes, Bailey wrote a "sneering attack" on Jay Wright Forrester, the father of system dynamics. In the article he described the book The Limits to Growth (LTG) as "as wrong-headed as it is possible to be". Bailey said, "Limits to Growth predicted that at 1972 rates of growth the world would run out of gold by 1981, mercury by 1985, tin by 1987, zinc by 1990, petroleum by 1992, copper, lead and natural gas by 1993". According to physical chemist and energy expert Ugo Bardi, "Bailey's accusations are just plain wrong." In 1993 Bailey repeated his accusations in his book Ecoscam, claiming that none of the projections of the 1972 LTG study turned out to be correct.

In Ecoscam, Bailey wrote, "Despite a great deal of continuing scientific uncertainty, it appears that CFCs do contribute to the creation of the Antarctic ozone hole and perhaps a tiny amount of global ozone depletion. ... [I]t makes sense to phase out the use of CFCs". When Science reported in July 2016 that the ozone layer was restoring itself after CFCs were banned, Bailey wrote, "Since atmospheric pollution presents significant barriers to assigning property rights, I concluded that the international treaty banning CFCs was the appropriate response".

The position taken in his 1995 book The True State of the Planet has been described as "growth forever" or "Promethean" arguing for unrestrained exploitation based on assumptions of unending nature, value derived exclusively from man's changes to material, and exceptional human resourcefulness. His follow-up book Earth Report 2000 was recognized for being among the works of established authors "who have argued that past and present widely accepted visions of environmental deterioration and disaster ... have little or no basis in fact". Citing these two books, Holt, Pressman and Spash describe the CEI as believing, "technology will solve all environmental problems and that present environmental dilemmas are simply a necessary outcome of much needed economic growth".

Bailey has described himself as a "libertarian transhumanist". He explains this in his book Liberation Biology.

In 2005, Bailey said that new data convinced him that the earth is definitely warming and that the likely cause is human activity. He has endorsed a carbon tax as one possible solution. He has stated in the article "Global Warming — Not Worse Than We Thought, But Bad Enough":

Details like sea level rise will continue to be debated by researchers, but if the debate over whether or not humanity is contributing to global warming wasn't over before, it is now ... as the new IPCC Summary makes clear, climate change Pollyannaism is no longer looking very tenable.

Bailey is critical of Al Gore and his film about global warming, writing, "on balance Gore gets it more right than wrong on the science (we'll leave the policy stuff to another time), but he undercuts his message by becoming the opposite of a global warming denier. He's a global warming exaggerator".

== Bibliography ==
=== Authored ===
- Eco-scam: The False Prophets of Ecological Apocalypse. St. Martin's Press. 1993. ISBN 978-0-312-10971-4.
- Liberation Biology: The Scientific and Moral Case for the Biotech Revolution. Prometheus. 2005. ISBN 978-1-61592-169-0.
- The End of Doom: Environmental Renewal in the Twenty-first Century. Thomas Dunne Books. 2015. ISBN 9781250057679.
- Ten Global Trends that Every Smart Person Needs to Know: And Many Other Trends You Will Find Interesting. Cato Institute. 2020. ISBN 978-1948647731.

=== Edited ===
- True State of the Planet. Free Press. 1995. ISBN 978-0-02-874010-2.
- Earth Report 2000: Revisiting the True State of the Planet. McGraw-Hill. 1999. ISBN 978-0-07-134260-5.
- Global Warming and Other Eco-myths: How the Environmental Movement Uses False Science to Scare Us to Death. Forum. 2002. ISBN 978-0-7615-3660-4.

== See also ==
- Brave New World argument
- Enough argument
