= Giuseppe Vatinno =

Italian politician, journalist and writer

Giuseppe Vatinno (Rome, April 3, 1961) is an Italian politician, journalist and writer.

As part of the Italy of Values party, he has been a member of the Observatory on High Speed Rail for the Bologna Node from 2006 to 2008, and advisor for environmental policies of the minister of infrastructure and member of the Commission for Environmental Impact Assessment of the Ministry of Environment from 2007 to 2008.

After leaving Italy of Values, as a member of Alliance for Italy party since 2010, he became the party's manager of the Environment and member of its National Steering Committee. In 2011, he was a member of the Technical Secretariat of the Ministry of Environment for the new technologies.

Following the resignation of Leoluca Orlando, as of July 10, 2012, he has been deputy of the Italian Republic, as the first non-elected in District 1 of Lazio's list for Italy of Values, until the end of the legislature on March 14, 2013. In November 2012, he left Alleanza per l'Italia and joined again the parliamentary group Italy of Values, of which he became National Manager for the Green Economy.

In 2012, after a campaign based on his book Il transumanesimo. Una nuova filosofia per l'uomo del XXI secolo (Transhumanism. A new philosophy for the man of the 21st century), he was described as 'the world's first transhumanist politician', however, a controversial parliamentary question he submitted about UFOs, and rooted in an apocryphal story, created a social media quarrel and eventually led one of the two Italian transhumanist association to explicitly disassociate his activity from the transhumanist movement.

== Publications ==
- Il transumanesimo. Una nuova filosofia per l'uomo del XXI secolo, Armando, 2010
- Solitoni nella Fisica Matematica, Aracne, 2015
