= Linda MacDonald Glenn =

American bioethicist

Linda MacDonald Glenn is an American bioethicist, healthcare educator, lecturer, consultant, and attorney-at-law. Her academic research encompasses the legal, ethical, and social impact of emerging and exponential technologies and "evolving notions of personhood".

== Biography ==
She is the founding director of the Center for Applied Values and Ethics in Advancing Technologies, housed at Crown College, University of California, Santa Cruz (UCSC). In addition to UCSC, she holds faculty appointments at California State University, Monterey Bay, and the Alden March Bioethics Institute at Albany Medical Center. She has also taught at the University of Vermont's College of Nursing and Health Sciences, and the University of the Sciences in Philadelphia's Department of Biomedical Writing. She is also a fellow of the Institute for Ethics and Emerging Technologies and a founding member of the Women's Bioethics Project. In addition, she completed a fellowship at the Institute for Ethics at the American Medical Association.

Prior to returning to an academic setting, Glenn consulted and practiced as a trial attorney with an emphasis in patient advocacy, bioethical and biotechnology issues, end of life decision-making, reproductive rights, genetics, neuroethics, parental/biological issues (a.k.a. nature vs. nurture), and animal rights. She was the lead attorney in several precedent-setting bioethics legal cases, including the Gray v. Romeo case.

She has advised governmental leaders and agencies, and she has published numerous articles in professional journals. Some of her better-known articles include "Legal and Ethical Issues in Regenerative Nanomedicine", "The Moveable Feast: Converging Technologies on our Dinner Tables", "Ethical Issues in Transgenics and Genetic Engineering" at Actionbioscience, "Keeping An Open Mind: What Legal Safeguards are needed?” in the American Journal of Bioethics, "Biotechnology at the Margins of Personhood: An Evolving Legal Paradigm" and "When Pigs Fly? Legal and Ethical Issues in Transgenics and the Creation of Chimeras".
