= Riccardo Campa =

Riccardo Campa (born 4 May 1967, in Mantua) is Professor of Sociology at the University of Cracow. He possesses two Master of Arts degrees, in Political Science and Philosophy, from the University of Bologna and a Ph.D. in Sociology from the Nicolaus Copernicus University in Toruń, Poland. Prior to becoming an academic, Campa was a police lieutenant with Guardia di Finanza and a journalist for La Voce di Mantova (The Voice of Mantua) and the newsmagazine Il Mondo (The World). Since 2010 he is vice president of the Filomati Association in Italy.

Campa has authored four books, titled Epistemological Dimensions of Robert Merton’s Sociology (2001), Il filosofo è nudo (2001), "Etica della scienza pura" (2007), and "Mutare o perire. La sfida del transumanesimo" (2010), and his articles frequently appear in MondOperaio, an Italian socialist journal. He founded and is currently president of the Italian Transhumanist Association, and is a Fellow of the Institute for Ethics and Emerging Technologies.

Campa has recorded over 15 solo and group music albums.

== Bibliography ==
- "Riccardo Campa". Institute for Ethics and Emerging Technologies.
