= Mark Alan Walker =

Canadian-American philosopher (born 1963)

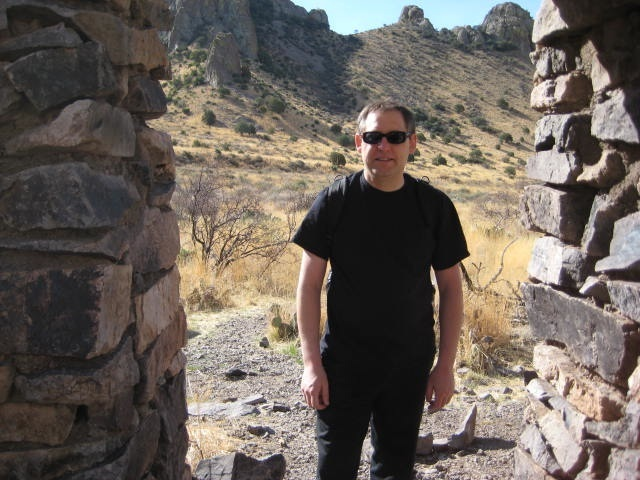
- Born: 1963; Vancouver, British Columbia, Canada
- Era: Contemporary philosophy
- Region: Western philosophy
- School: Perfectionism, transhumanism
- Main interests: Ethics
- Notable ideas: Biohappiness

Mark Alan Walker (born 1963) is a Canadian-American philosopher. He is a professor of philosophy at New Mexico State University, where he occupies the Richard L. Hedden Endowed Chair in Advanced Philosophical Studies. Prior to his professorship at NMSU Prof. Walker taught at McMaster University in the department of philosophy and the Arts & Science Programme. He is the author of Happy-People Pills for All (Oxford: Blackwell Press, 2013) and Free Money for All (New York: Palgrave, 2016). Walker founded and was president of the former nonprofit organization Permanent End International (2003–2007), which had been devoted to ending hunger, illiteracy and environmental degradation through the dissemination of modular aquaponics systems for farming. He serves on the editorial board of the Journal of Evolution and Technology and on the board of directors of the Institute for Ethics and Emerging Technologies. He is a former board member of the non-profit organization Humanity+ (formerly World Transhumanist Association).

Professor Walker is a consequentialist who argues that humans have a responsibility to perfect themselves in the realm of morality and virtue. He has written extensively about the ethics of using technology to enhance human capabilities (including advocacy of superlongevity and biohappiness); about the possibility of enhancing virtue genetically, through both genetic modification and the cultivation of humans with larger brains and a better understanding of moral reasoning; and about the moral obligations that humans may have toward artificially intelligent beings in the future. He also co-authored an influential piece about the nexus between transhumanism and religion, with Heidi Campbell.
