= George Dvorsky =

Canadian bioethicist, transhumanist, and futurist

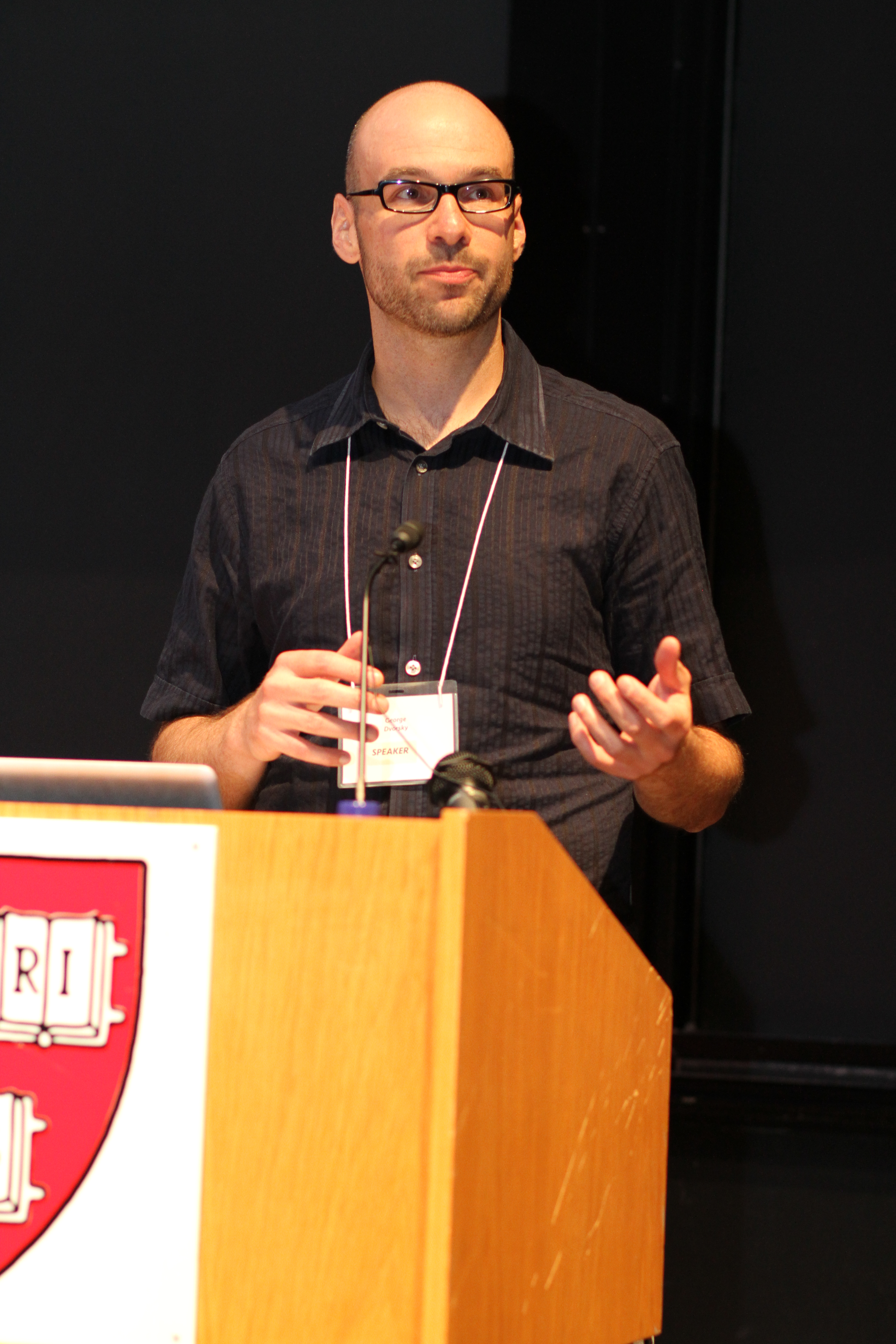
- Born: May 11, 1970 (age 56)
- Website: www.sentientdevelopments.com

George P. Dvorsky (born May 11, 1970) is a Canadian bioethicist, transhumanist and futurist. He is a contributing editor at io9 and producer of the Sentient Developments blog and podcast. He was chair of the board for the Institute for Ethics and Emerging Technologies (IEET) and is the founder and chair of the IEET's Rights of Non-Human Persons Program, a group that is working to secure human-equivalent rights and protections for highly sapient animals. He also serves on the Advisory Council of METI (Messaging Extraterrestrial Intelligence).

Dvorsky is a secular Buddhist, progressive environmentalist, ancestral health advocate, and animal rights activist. He writes and speaks on a wide range of topics, including technoscience, ethics, existential risks, artificial intelligence, the search for extraterrestrial intelligence, and futurology, from a democratic transhumanist perspective.

== Nonhuman rights and ethics ==
Dvorsky presented an argument for non-human animal biological uplift at the IEET Human Enhancement Technologies and Human Rights conference at Stanford University in May 2006.

== Space development ==
Dvorsky gained some notoriety in 2012 after writing about Dyson spheres, hypothetical structures intended to collect the entire energetic output of a star with solar power collectors. While Dvorsky presented it as a solution to humanity's resource needs including power and living space, Forbes blogger Alex Knapp and astronomer Phil Plait, among others, have criticized Dvorsky's article.

Dismantling Mercury, just to start, will take 2 × 10^{30} joules, or an amount of energy 100 billion times the US annual energy consumption ... [Dvorsky] kinda glosses over that point. And how long until his solar collectors gather that much energy back, and we’re in the black?

— Phil Plait

At one AU – which is the distance of the orbit of the Earth, the Sun emits 1.4 × 10^{3} J/sec per square meter. (Note: This is related to how far we are from the sun, and if we know the energy output of the sun (3.846×10^{26} W) we can calculate based on distance using the formula for surface area of a sphere 3.846*10^{26}W/(4pi * au^{2}/m^{2}) = ~1400W/m^{2}) That’s 1.4 × 10^{9} J/sec per square kilometer. At one-third efficiency, that’s 4.67 × 10^{8} J/sec for the entire Dyson sphere. That sounds like a lot, right? But here’s the thing – if you work it out, it will take 4.28 × 10^{28} seconds for the solar collectors to obtain the energy needed to dismantle Mercury. That’s about 120 trillion years.

— Alex Knapp

Other publications including Popular Science, Vice, and skeptical blog Weird Things followed up on this exchange. None of them note the above numerical inaccuracies, although Weird Things does point out Plait's misunderstanding regarding bootstrapping, which Knapp agreed with in an update to his post. James Nicoll noted in his blog that Knapp seriously underestimated the area of a sphere.
