= Human enhancement =

Natural, artificial, or technological alteration of the human body

Human enhancement is the natural, artificial, or technological alteration of the human body in order to enhance physical or mental capabilities.

== Technologies ==
=== Existing technologies ===
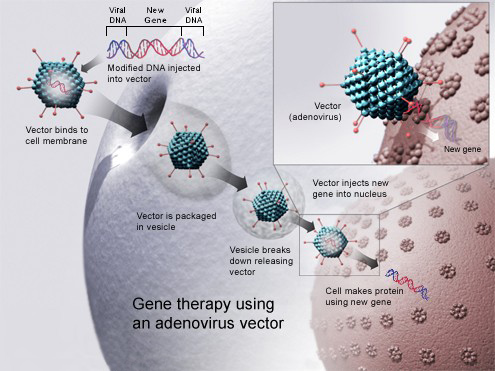
Gene therapy using an adenovirus vector

Three forms of human enhancement currently exist: reproductive, physical, and mental. Reproductive enhancements include embryo selection by preimplantation genetic diagnosis, cytoplasmictransfer, and in vitro-generated gametes. Physical enhancements include cosmetics (plastic surgery and orthodontics), drug-induced (doping and performance-enhancing drugs), functional (prosthetics and powered exoskeletons), medical (implants (e.g. pacemaker) and organ replacements (e.g. bionic lenses)), and strength training (weights (e.g. barbells) and dietary supplement)). Examples of mental enhancements are nootropics, neurostimulation, and supplements that improve mental functions. Computers, mobile phones, and the Internet can also be used to enhance cognitive efficiency. Notable efforts in human augmentation are driven by interconnected Internet of Things (IoT) devices, including wearable electronics (e.g., augmented reality glasses, smart watches, smart textile), personal drones, on-body and in-body nanonetworks.

=== Emerging technologies ===
Many different forms of human enhancing technologies are either on the way or are currently being tested and trialed. A few of these emerging technologies include human genetic engineering (gene therapy), neurotechnology (neural implants and brain–computer interfaces), cyberware, strategies for engineered negligible senescence, nanomedicine, and 3D bioprinting. Variants of human genetic engineering with so far limited usage include the artificial creation of human-animal hybrids (where each cell has partly human and partly animal genetic contents) and human-animal chimeras (where some cells are human and some cells are animal in origin).

=== Speculative technologies ===
Some other human enhancement technologies are still speculative, such as: mind uploading, exocortex, and endogenous artificial nutrition. Mind uploading is the hypothetical process of "transferring"/"uploading" or copying a conscious mind from a brain to a non-biological substrate by scanning and mapping a biological brain in detail and copying its state into a computer system or another computational device. The exocortex can be defined as a theoretical artificial external information processing system that would augment a brain's biological high-level cognitive processes. Endogenous artificial nutrition can be similar to having a radioisotope generator that resynthesizes glucose (similarly to photosynthesis), amino acids and vitamins from their degradation products, theoretically availing for weeks without food if necessary.

Nick Bostrom listed some additional capabilities that are expected to be physically possible in theory, given a sufficient technological level, such as:

- Reversal of aging
- Cures for all diseases
- Arbitrary sensory inputs (e.g. generating subjective experience of taste without eating anything)
- Precise control of personality, mood, motivation, well-being

== Nootropics ==
There are many substances that are purported to have promise in augmenting human cognition by various means. These substances are called nootropics and can potentially benefit individuals with cognitive decline and many different disorders, but may also be capable of yielding results in cognitively healthy persons. Generally speaking, nootropics are said to be effective for enhancing focus, learning, memory function, mood, and in some cases, physical brain development. Some examples of these include Citicoline, Huperzine A, Phosphatidylserine, Bacopa monnieri, Acetyl-L-carnitine, Uridine monophosphate, L-theanine, Rhodiola rosea, and Pycnogenol which are all forms of dietary supplement. There are also nootropic drugs such as the common racetams, e.g. piracetam (Nootropil) and omberacetam (Noopept) along with the neuroprotective Semax, and N-Acetyl Semax. There are also nootropics related to naturally occurring substances but that are either modified in a lab or are analogs such as Vinpocetine and Sulbutiamine. Some authors have explored nootropics as relationship enhancements to help couples maintain bonds over time.

== Ethics ==
Much debate surrounds the topic of human enhancement and the means used to achieve one's enhancement goals. Ethical attitudes toward human enhancement can depend on many factors such as religious affiliation, age, gender, ethnicity, culture of origin, and nationality.

In some circles the expression "human enhancement" is roughly synonymous with human genetic engineering, but most often it is referred to the general application of the convergence of nanotechnology, biotechnology, information technology and cognitive science (NBIC) to improve human performance.

Since the 1990s, several academics (such as some of the fellows of the Institute for Ethics and Emerging Technologies) have risen to become advocates of the case for human enhancement while other academics (such as the members of President Bush's Council on Bioethics) have become outspoken critics.

Advocacy of the case for human enhancement is increasingly becoming synonymous with "transhumanism", a controversial ideology and movement which has emerged to support the recognition and protection of the right of citizens to either maintain or modify their own minds and bodies; so as to guarantee them the freedom of choice and informed consent of using human enhancement technologies on themselves and their children. Their common understanding of the world can be seen from a physicist perspective rather than a biological perspective. Based on the idea of technological singularity, human enhancement is merging with technological innovation that will advance post-humanism.

Neuromarketing consultant Zack Lynch argues that neurotechnologies will have a more immediate effect on society than gene therapy and will face less resistance as a pathway of radical human enhancement. He also argues that the concept of "enablement" needs to be added to the debate over "therapy" versus "enhancement".

The prospect of human enhancement has sparked public controversy. The main ethical question in the debate about human enhancement involves which legal restrictions, if any, should exist.

Dale Carrico wrote that "human enhancement" is a loaded term which has eugenic overtones because it may imply the improvement of human hereditary traits to attain a universally accepted norm of biological fitness (at the possible expense of human biodiversity and neurodiversity), and therefore can evoke negative reactions far beyond the specific meaning of the term. Michael Selgelid terms this as a phase of "neugenics" suggesting that gene enhancements occurring now have already revived the idea of eugenics in our society. Practices of prenatal diagnosis, selective abortion and in-vitro fertilization aims to improve human life allowing for parents to decide via genetic information if they want to continue or terminate the pregnancy.

A criticism of human enhancement is that it will create unfair physical or mental advantages, or unequal access to such enhancements, can and will further the gulf between the "haves" and "have-nots".

Futurist Ray Kurzweil has shown some concern that, within the century, humans may be required to merge with this technology in order to compete in the marketplace. Enhanced individuals have a better chance of being chosen for better opportunities in careers, entertainment and resources. For example, life-extending technologies can increase the average individual life span, affecting the distribution of pension throughout the society. Increasing lifespan will affect human population, further dividing limited resources such as food, energy, monetary resources and habitat. Other critics of human enhancement fear that such capabilities would change, for the worse, the dynamic relations within a family. Given the choices of superior qualities, parents make their child as opposed to merely birthing it, and the newborn becomes a product of their will rather than a gift of nature to be loved unconditionally.

=== Effects on identity ===
Human enhancement technologies can impact human identity by affecting one's self-conception. The argument does not necessarily come from the idea of improving the individual but rather changing who they are and becoming someone new. Altering an individual identity affects their personal story, development and mental capabilities. The basis of this argument comes from two main points: the charge of inauthenticity and the charge of violating an individual's core characteristics. Gene therapy has the ability to alter one's mental capacity, and through this argument, has the ability to affect their narrative identity. An individual's core characteristics may include internal psychological style, personality, general intelligence, necessity to sleep, normal aging, gender and being Homo sapiens. Technologies threaten to alter the self fundamentally to the point where the result is, essentially, a different person entirely. For example, extreme changes in personality may affect the individual's relationships because others can no longer relate to the new person.

The capability approach focuses on a normative framework that can be applied to how human enhancement technologies affects human capabilities. The ethics of this does not necessarily focus on the make up of the individual but rather what it allows individuals to do in today's society. This approach was first termed by Amartya Sen, where he mainly focused on the objectives of the approach rather than the aim for those objectives which entail resources, technological processes, and economic arrangement. The central human capabilities include life, bodily health, bodily integrity, sense, emotions, practical reason, affiliation, other species, play, and control over one's environment. This normative framework recognizes that human capabilities are always changing and technology has already played a part in this.

== See also ==
- Anti-aging movement
- Assisted reproductive technologies
- Biohappiness
- Body modification
- Cloning
- Congenital analgesia
- Directed evolution (transhumanism)
- Evidence-based learning
- Gene therapy
- Genetic engineering
- Grinder (biohacking)
- Human-animal hybrid
- Life extension
- Moral enhancement
- Morphological freedom
- Posthuman
- Posthumanization
- Technological singularity
- Transhumanism
