= Morphological freedom =

Proposed civil right

Morphological freedom refers to a proposed civil right of a person to either maintain or modify their own body, on their own terms, through informed, consensual recourse to, or refusal of, available therapeutic or enabling medical technology.

The term may have been coined by transhumanist Max More in his 1993 article, “Technological Self-Transformation: Expanding Personal Extropy”, where he defined it as "the ability to alter bodily form at will through technologies such as surgery, genetic engineering, nanotechnology, uploading". The term was later used by science debater and futurist Anders Sandberg as "an extension of one’s right to one’s body, not just self-ownership but also the right to modify oneself according to one’s desires."

The Massachusetts-headquartered charity, the Freedom of Form Foundation, was founded in 2018 to advocate and fund scientific research furthering progress on morphological freedom, the tools required to achieve it and its general acceptance in society at large.

== Politics ==
According to technocritic Dale Carrico, the politics of morphological freedom imply a commitment to the value, standing, and social legibility of the widest possible variety of desired morphologies and lifestyles. More specifically, morphological freedom is an expression of liberal pluralism, secularism, progressive cosmopolitanism, and posthumanist multiculturalisms applied to the ongoing and upcoming transformation of the understanding of medical practice from one of conventional therapy to one of consensual self-determination, via genetic, prosthetic, and cognitive modification.

Ben Ramanauskas, an economist at the University of Oxford argues that reforming the laws and taking a more liberal approach to body modification and transhumanism could tap into the potential for improvements to health and well-being, and would eventually allow humanity to flourish.

== Religion ==
According to authors Calvin Mercer and Tracy J. Trothen there is tension between religion and transhumanists, particularly the Abrahamic traditions, with regards to morphological freedom. While religion generally recognizes the need to heal people and improve their situation from a medical perspective they are generally hesitant to promote a wholesale modification of the body as they see it ultimately belonging to God.

== See also ==
- Artistic freedom
- Autonomy
- Bodily integrity
- Cognitive liberty
- Gender-affirming hormone therapy
- Gender-affirming surgery
- My body, my choice
- Neuroenhancement
- Otherkin
- Postgenderism
- Reproductive rights
- Self-ownership
