= Dale Carrico =

American academic

Dale Carrico (born 1965) is an American critical theorist and rhetorician. He is a critic of futurology and geoengineering.

Carrico received his Ph.D. from the Department of Rhetoric at the University of California at Berkeley in 2005 and is an adjunct at the San Francisco Art Institute. Carrico was the Human Rights Fellow at the Institute for Ethics and Emerging Technologies from 2004 to 2008. He organized the 12th Annual Boundaries in Question Conference in March 2003, the 13th Annual Boundaries in Question Conference in March 2004, on the topic "New Feminist Perspectives on Biotechnology and Bioethics", and was conference chair of the IEET conference on "Human Enhancement Technologies and Human Rights" held at Stanford Law School in May 2006.

== Online publications ==
- Carrico, Dale (2009). "Superlative futurology". Re-public. Archived from the original on June 28, 2009.
