= Institute for Ethics and Emerging Technologies =

US technoprogressive think tank

- Founders: Nick Bostrom, James Hughes
- Established: 2004; 22 years ago
- Mission: To promote ideas on how technology can be used to "increase freedom, happiness, and human flourishing in democratic societies."
- Executive: James Hughes
- Faculty: 25 Fellows, 13 Affiliate Scholars
- Staff: Steven Umbrello, Marcelo Rinesi
- Website: www.ieet.org

The Institute for Ethics and Emerging Technologies (IEET) is a technoprogressive think tank that seeks to "promote ideas about how technological progress can increase freedom, happiness, and human flourishing in democratic societies." It was incorporated in the United States in 2004, as a non-profit 501(c)(3) organization, by philosopher Nick Bostrom and bioethicist James Hughes.

The think tank aims to influence the development of public policies that distribute the benefits and reduce the risks of technological change. It has been described as "[a]mong the more important groups" in the transhumanist movement, and as being among the transhumanist groups that "play a strong role in the academic arena".

The IEET works with Humanity Plus (also founded and chaired by Bostrom and Hughes, and previously known as the World Transhumanist Association), an international non-governmental organization with a similar mission but with an activist rather than academic approach. A number of technoprogressive thinkers are offered positions as IEET Fellows. Individuals who have accepted such appointments with the IEET support the institute's mission, but they have expressed a wide range of views about emerging technologies and not all identify themselves as transhumanists. In early October 2012, Kris Notaro became the managing director of the IEET after the previous Managing Director Hank Pellissier stepped down. In April 2016, Steven Umbrello became the managing director of the IEET. Marcelo Rinesi is the IEET's Chief Technology Officer.

== Activities ==
=== Publications ===
The Institute publishes, the Journal of Ethics and Emerging Technologies (JEET), formerly the Journal of Evolution and Technology (JET), a peer-reviewed academic journal. JET was established in 1998 as the Journal of Transhumanism and obtained its current title in 2004. The editor-in-chief is Mark Walker. It covers futurological research into long-term developments in science, technology, and philosophy that "many mainstream journals shun as too speculative, radical, or interdisciplinary." The institute also maintains a technology and ethics blog that is supported by various writers.

=== Programs ===
In 2006, the IEET launched the following activities:

1. Securing the Future: Identification and advocacy for global solutions to threats to the future of civilization.
2. Rights of the Person: Campaign to deepen and broaden the concept of human rights.
3. Longer, Better Lives: Case for longer healthier lives, addressing objections to life extension, challenge ageist and ableist attitudes that discourage the full utilization of health technology.
4. Envisioning the Future: Collection of images of posthumanity and non-human intelligence, positive, negative and neutral, e.g., in science fiction and popular culture; engagement with cultural critics, artists, writers, and filmmakers in exploring the lessons to be derived from these.

The institute has since shifted its research away from these programs and towards research on the policy implications of human enhancement and other emerging technologies. It has since partnered with the Applied Ethics Center at the University of Massachusetts Boston to focus on two specific programs:

1. Artificial Intelligence and the Future of Work, Democracy, and Conflict
2. Cyborgs and Human Enhancement

=== Conferences ===
In late May 2006, the IEET held the Human Enhancement Technologies and Human Rights conference at the Stanford University Law School in Stanford, California. The IEET along with other progressive organizations hosted a conference in December 2013 at Yale University on giving various species "personhood" rights. Fellows of the Institute represent the Institute at various conferences and events, including the NASA Institute for Advanced Concepts and the American Association for the Advancement of Science. In 2014, the IEET lead and/or co-sponsored five conferences including: Eros Evolving: The Future of Love, Sex, Marriage and Beauty conference in April in Piedmont, California, and the Global Existential Risks and Radical Futures conference in June in Piedmont, California.

== Reception ==
Wesley J. Smith, an American conservative lawyer and advocate of intelligent design, wrote that the institute has one of the most active transhumanist websites, and the writers write on the "nonsense of uploading minds into computers and fashioning a post humanity." Smith also criticized the results of the institute's online poll that indicated the majority of Institute's readers are atheist or agnostic. According to Smith, this was evidence that transhumanism is a religion and a desperate attempt to find purpose in a nihilistic and materialistic world. The institute's advocacy project to raise the status of animals to the legal status of personhood also drew criticism from Smith because he claimed humans are exceptional and raising the status of animals may lower the status of humans.

Katarina Felsted and Scott D. Wright wrote that although the IEET considers itself technoprogressive some of its views can be described as strong transhumanism or a "radical version of post ageing", and one particular criticism of both moderate and strong transhumanism is that moral arbitrariness undermine both forms of transhumanism.

== Recent developments (2016 – present) ==
In 2016, IEET started to work with other universities on research projects to expand its research programs and reach more audiences. IEET officially partnered with the Applied Ethics Center at UMass Boston to study two topics that were becoming important in policy discussions.

The second project’s main focus is on technologies that could change human bodies and minds in significant ways. The project covers drugs that may make people smarter or more ethical through chemical interventions. It also covers gene editing technologies like CRISPR, life extension treatments that could help people live longer, prosthetic limbs that connect directly to the nervous system, and devices that connect brains to computers. Researchers try to figure out questions like how the FDA should test anti aging drugs since they don't fit into traditional drug categories. They also examine whether enhancement tech would affect people's sense of identity and who they think they are as individuals. Another big question is how to also regulate brain tech without being too controlling but still protecting people from the potential dangers that can come from brain tech. One controversial question is whether technologies that change moral decisions should be used in prisons or courtrooms to rehabilitate criminals. IEET not only looks at the scientific possibilities, but also the ethical problems that come with the use of these technologies. Researchers also study how different countries approach regulation of human enhancement and also whether there should be international regulations for these types of technologies.

In order to be able to support research programs like this, UMass Boston and IEET created three postdoctoral fellowship positions that would focus specifically on these topics. Funding would be provided for the people in the fellowships for early career researchers to spend time developing their expertise in technology ethics while producing academic work. Researchers have published academic papers covering subjects such as how AI relates to practical wisdom and the ability to make good decisions in complex situations. There are also policy reports about AI therapy chatbots and whether they should be regulated like medical devices. But, not only do researchers write for conferences but they also write for general audiences such as regular people who can also understand the ethical questions about new technologies. Their articles ask whether schools can prepare students for automation and what kind of education will be needed in the future. They also talk about how AI stops people from making genuine choices by predicting what they want and limiting their options. They then present their research at academic conferences and policy workshops to share their findings with both scholars and policymakers who are working on technology regulation. They combine solid research with hands-on policy analysis to address real problems that governments and companies face when dealing with emerging technologies.

IEET expanded internationally in 2024 in order to connect more researchers and policymakers in different regions. During this time, The Ethics and Emerging Technologies at the University of Turin in Italy was also established by the IEET, to establish a presence in Europe.

They study ethical problems that come from emerging tech and how different European countries approach technology regulation. The main focus is for keeping technology human centered as well as understanding technologies from multiple perspectives including philosophy, law, and social science. IEET tackles tech ethics as a global problem and works on making AI systems trustworthy and work well with people’s values. People are trained through fellowship programs and workshops, producing research that is useful for policymakers globally who are creating new technology regulations. Steven Umbrello is the managing director of the Ethics and Emerging Technologies at the University of Turin and oversees the research programs and fellowship activities. There are many collaborations including universities, governments, and different companies from around the world to understand how technology ethics plays a role in different regulatory contexts. The Ethics and Emerging Technologies at the University of Turin allows IEET to compare how European countries regulate technology differently from the USA and other regions. Therefore, better international rules for emerging technologies can be created.

The organization's leader, James Hughes is the executive director and co-founder. He provides overall plans for IEET's research programs and partnerships. Steven Umbrello is the managing director. He handles day to day operations and oversees the fellowship programs and research initiatives. Marcelo Rinsei is the chief technology officer making sure the organization understands new technologies correctly and can provide accurate analysis of technical developments. In 2025, UNESCO added IEET to its database of civil society organizations working on AI ethics and policy. This addition of IEET confirms that IEET is recognized internationally as a voice in technology ethics debates and policy discussions, giving the organization more visibility in international discussion. The IEET works on making sure that new technologies help people and society rather than cause harm such as researching to make sure to look at both the benefits and the risks. The team strives to keep their partnerships with academic institutions, government agencies, and international organizations. This helps create better international rules for emerging technologies.

Between 2020 and 2025, IEET has supported researchers through fellowship programs that focus on different aspects of technology ethics. Alec Stubbs completed a fellowship program where he studied how automation and how AI might change employment and what policies could help workers adapt to these changes.

Fellowship in human enhancement biology was also awarded to Cristiano Cali, where his research examined the ethical and biological issues surrounding technologies that have the potential to alter human capacities. Lastly, Cody Turner also established a fellowship to study human thought and artificial intelligence. His main focus was on the implications for society of how artificial intelligence systems digest information differently than humans.

IEET's blog has been moved to Substack which changed how the organization shares content with readers. This makes it much easier for people to read their articles and research and subscribe to updates when new content gets posted. The platform allows writers to publish longer essays rather than normal blog formats, which ultimately gives them more space to explain in depth ethical questions about technology. Writers can also interact with readers through comments and discussions which creates conversations between researchers and the public. The move to Substack happened because the organization wanted to reach more people and make content easier to access on different devices including phones and tablets.

For the purpose of increasing the amount of people who could access their work without paying subscription fees, the IEET published several research papers for free to the public online in 2024. Human enhancement, reproductive ethics, and quantum technology were covered as the range of topics the researchers studied. Some of the online papers discussed topics such as whether parents should be allowed to use gene editing on their children, or how quantum computers might affect privacy and security. IEET's goal is to make technology ethics available to not just universities or organizations, but to everyone such as students. Policymakers, journalists, and students can download the free papers to read and learn on different viewpoints on technological ethics.

Throughout the year, new issues of the Journal of Ethics and Emerging Technologies are released on a regular basis. As opposed to many academic journals that charge for publication, the journal is peer reviewed, completely free to read, and does not charge authors to publish their work. Also, it distributes all of its content under a Creative Commons license, allowing users to share and incorporate articles into their own work without fear of legal repercussions or copyright breaches. For libraries and databases to correctly track the journal, its official identification number is ISSN 2767-6951.

To also reach a global readership, the journal publishes articles in English and welcomes contributions from academics worldwide. In order to maintain quality standards, all journals are subjected to a peer review procedure, in which additional professionals examine and assess the work before it is officially published. Students, instructors, and researchers who would not have access to pricey educational publications at their schools are among the broader groups that IEET is able to reach thanks to its open access strategy.
