= Émile P. Torres =

American philosopher, historian, and author (born 1982)

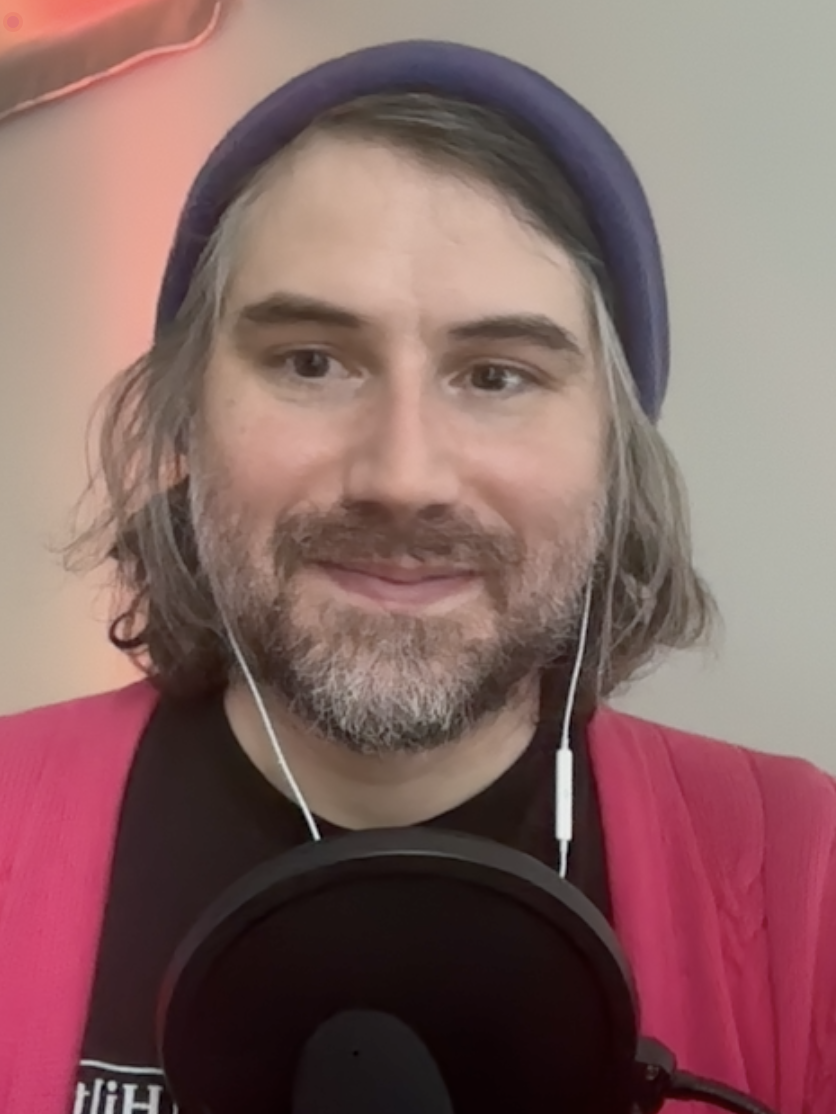
- Torres in 2025
- Born: 2 July 1982 (age 44)

Academic background
- Education: University of Maryland, College Park (BA); Brandeis University (MS); Leibniz University Hannover (Ph.D)
- Thesis: "Human Extinction: A History of the Science and Ethics of Annihilation"

Academic work
- Main interests: Eschatology, existential risk, and human extinction

Émile P. Torres (born 2 July 1982), formerly known as Phil Torres, is an American philosopher, intellectual historian, activist, and podcast host. Their research focuses on eschatology, existential risk, and human extinction. Along with computer scientist Timnit Gebru, Torres coined the neologism "TESCREAL" to criticize what they see as a group of related philosophies: transhumanism, extropianism, singularitarianism, cosmism, rationalism, effective altruism, and longtermism.

== Early life and education ==
Torres grew up in Maryland. They were raised in a fundamentalist evangelical Christian family, but later left the religion and became an atheist. They attribute their interest in eschatology to their fundamentalist upbringing, which exposed them to substantial discussion of the Rapture.

Torres attended the University of Maryland, College Park and earned a Bachelor of Arts with honors in philosophy in 2007. In 2009, they earned a Master of Science in neuroscience from Brandeis University. Simultaneously, from 2008 to 2009, they were a special student at Harvard University in the philosophy department. In 2020, Torres began a philosophy Ph.D. program at the Leibniz University Hannover.

== Career ==
Much of Torres's work focused on existential risk, the study of potential catastrophic events that could result in human extinction. More recently, they have focused on "existential ethics", which they define as "questions about whether our extinction would be right or wrong to bring about if it happened".

In 2016, Torres published a book titled The End: What Science and Religion Tell Us About the Apocalypse, which discusses both religious and secular eschatology, and describes threats from technologies such as nuclear weapons, biological engineering, nanotechnology, and artificial intelligence. In 2017 they published another book, titled Morality, Foresight, and Human Flourishing: An Introduction to Existential Risks. Like their first book, it discusses a range of existential threats, but also delves into what they term "agential risk": the roles of outside agents in existential risk. Morality, Foresight, and Human Flourishing was positively reviewed in Futures as a "current and timely" introduction to existential risk.

From 2023 to 2024, Torres was a visiting postdoctoral researcher at Case Western Reserve University's Inamori International Center for Ethics and Excellence. Also in 2023, Routledge published Torres's Human Extinction: A History of the Science and Ethics of Annihilation. The book posits that the rise of Christianity, along with Christianity's focus on salvation, removed the topic of human extinction from public discourse.They argue that concerns around human extinction have re-emerged amid increasing secularism. While Torres does not in practice "wish to see or promote" human extinction, they contend that it would not be inherently bad if it were to occur without violence, such as through declining birthrates.

Torres has published in popular media including The Washington Post and Current Affairs, and is a contributing writer to Salon and Truthdig.

Torres currently cohosts a podcast with comedian Kate Willett.

=== Transhumanism, longtermism, and effective altruism ===
For the first decade of their career, Torres identified as a transhumanist, longtermist, and effective altruist. Before 2017, Torres contributed writing to the Future of Life Institute, a non-profit organization focused on technology and existential risk. After turning against the organization and opposing techno-optimism with ideas such as a need for a moratorium on the development of artificial intelligence, Torres says they were ousted and their writing removed from the website.

Torres later left the longtermist, transhumanist, and effective altruist communities, and became a vocal critic. Torres claims that longtermism and related ideologies stem from eugenics, and could be used to justify "dangerous" consequentialist thinking. Along with Timnit Gebru, Torres coined the term "TESCREAL" to refer to what they see as a group of related philosophies: transhumanism, extropianism, singularitarianism, cosmism, rationalism, effective altruism, and longtermism. They first publicized the term in a paper on artificial general intelligence (AGI). Torres argued that a race towards developing AGI would instead produce systems that harm marginalized groups and concentrate power.

Torres continued to write extensively about the philosophies, and about how they intersect with respect to artificial intelligence. They have criticized adherents of those philosophies for treating AGI as a technological solution to issues like climate change and access to education, while ignoring other political, social, or economic factors. They have also expressed concern over their belief that longtermism is prominent in the tech industry. Torres has also been described as a critic of techno-optimism.

Torres has also written about artificial intelligence, and has advocated for more focus on AI harms including intellectual property theft, algorithmic bias, and concentration of wealth in technology corporations. Although effective altruism and a newer philosophy known as effective accelerationism have been described by most observers, including members of both groups, as opposing sides of the argument on how to approach developing artificial intelligence, Torres has opined that the two groups are in fact very similar, and characterized the conflict as a "family dispute". "What's missing is all of the questions that AI ethicists are asking about algorithmic bias, discrimination, the environmental impact of [AI systems], and so on," Torres told The Independent.

Andrew Anthony, writing in The Observer, has described Torres as longtermism's "most vehement critic".

== Personal life ==
Torres is non-binary and uses they/them pronouns. Torres is a musician and songwriter, having founded the electronic-folk band Baobab. The band released two full-length albums, Baobab (2012) and BAYOHBAHB (Hand Eye Records, 2013).

== Selected publications ==
=== Books ===
- The End: What Science and Religion Tell Us about the Apocalypse. Pitchstone Publishing. February 16, 2016. ISBN 978-1-63431-040-6.
- Morality, Foresight, and Human Flourishing: An Introduction to Existential Risks. Pitchstone Publishing. October 2017. ISBN 978-1-63431-142-7.
- Human Extinction: A History of the Science and Ethics of Annihilation. Routledge. July 14, 2023. ISBN 978-1-032-15906-5.

=== Papers ===
- Gebru, Timnit; Torres, Émile P. (April 1, 2024). "The TESCREAL bundle: Eugenics and the promise of utopia through artificial general intelligence". First Monday. 29 (4). doi:10.5210/fm.v29i4.13636.
