= Polycrisis =

Intersecting global crises with compounding effects across systems

A polycrisis (from the French polycrise) describes multiple crises (economic, environmental, geopolitical, social, or technological) occurring simultaneously and interacting in ways that amplify each other, producing outcomes more severe than the sum of the individual crises. The concept highlights the interdependencies and feedback loops within global systems, where shocks in one domain (e.g., climate change, financial instability, pandemics, energy insecurity, or political conflict) cascade into others. Beyond describing complexity and fragility, the "polycrisis" also captures elite helplessness in the face of ruptures, as observed in Project Syndicate: "We often complain that [leaders] in Davos are out of touch with everyday people. Today... they are just as confused as the people they are meant to represent." Critics such as Daniel Drezner have characterized it as a buzzword, which may distract from the root causes of crises and create an overwhelming sense of complexity that hinders effective responses.

Although the word was coined in the 1990s by French theorists Edgar Morin and Anne-Brigitte Kern, it gained widespread currency in the 2010s through amplification by Western leaders, academics and institutions such as the World Economic Forum (WEF). Adam Tooze is widely credited for popularizing the term, after he was profiled at Davos in 2023 in a prominent segment "Tooze has his say." Defining the meaning and salience of polycrisis, Adam Tooze states: "Here is your fear. This is what it might be called." Mark Leonard, Director of the European Council on Foreign Relations, described global elites' reactions to the polycrisis narrative at Davos as "exhausting and bewildering."

Scholars distinguish a polycrisis from a mere coincidence of crises: it implies systemic entanglement, where crises cannot be effectively understood—or resolved—in isolation. The framing has been influential in academic, policy, and media discussions around global governance, risk management, and long-term sustainability.

Others argue that as a buzzword of the world's economic elite, the idea has been developed without taking the experiences of people in the global South into consideration, people who have experienced multiple and interlocking crises for decades. One direct counter-narrative is polytunity, proposed by Yuen Yuen Ang, which reframes the polycrisis not as paralysis but as a generational opening for deep transformation of global institutions and thought, emphasizing the principles of AIM (Adaptive, Inclusive, Moral), local agency, and solutions from the global south.

== Background ==
The term polycrisis was first introduced by French philosopher and sociologist Edgar Morin in his 1993 book Terre-Patrie, co-authored with Anne-Brigitte Kern (and translated into English as Homeland Earth: A Manifesto for the New Millennium in 1999). Morin's thinking drew on emerging concepts in complexity science and systems theory, emphasizing that modern challenges—economic, ecological, social, and cultural—cannot be treated in isolation. He argued that these crises interweave and amplify each other, creating a cascading effect if addressed piecemeal rather than holistically.

Morin developed his formulation during a period of significant geopolitical change following the end of the Cold War and the breakup of the Soviet bloc. The rapid expansion of economic globalization further underscored how deeply interconnected national economies and infrastructures had become, making societies more vulnerable to disruptions that could quickly escalate from local incidents to international crises. During this same era, attention to environmental risks surged—spurred in part by publications like The Limits to Growth (1972)—and concerns about the ozone layer and climate change highlighted humanity's dependence on finite planetary resources.

The interconnectedness of these crises means that solutions in one area can often lead to unintended consequences in another, creating a feedback loop that exacerbates the overall situation. As Morin noted, this web of interlinked crises reflects a deeper structural vulnerability within socio-economic, political, and ecological systems.

Although Morin's concept initially remained somewhat peripheral, it gained renewed traction in the early 21st century as scholars and institutions began observing multiple, overlapping crises in real time—spanning financial upheavals, geopolitical tensions, climate disruption, rising inequality, and public health emergencies. By the 2020s, the term polycrisis became more widely recognized, pointing to the idea that modern crises are not merely simultaneous but structurally interlinked, reinforcing one another into a durable state of global instability.

Advocates of the polycrisis framework stress the need for systemic and integrated approaches that move beyond traditional problem-solving methods. As humanity grapples with the compounding effects of these interconnected crises, the recognition of a polycrisis signals both the scale of the challenge and the potential for new forms of collaborative, sustainable solutions.

== Components ==
=== Ecological overshoot and limits to growth ===
The concept of polycrisis aligns with the warnings issued in the Limits to Growth report, which suggested that unchecked economic growth and resource consumption would eventually surpass the Earth's carrying capacity. Human ecological overshoot—using resources faster than they can be replenished—has led to environmental degradation, climate change, and biodiversity loss, which in turn threaten the stability and continuity of human societies.

=== Challenges to the liberal international order ===
Since the late 20th century, observers have increasingly noted contradictions within the Western liberal democracies that shaped the post–World War II international order. While outwardly premised on ideals of self-determination and economic development, these states have often pursued policies described as imperialistic by scholars and commentators, creating tensions between professed egalitarian values and geopolitical practice. Such contradictions have contributed to debates over the legitimacy of a 'rules-based' liberal order. In parallel, the rise of right-wing populism and the weakening of the Western social contract have reflected growing internal public dissatisfaction with political and economic institutions. Analysts link these shifts to widening economic inequality, perceived threats to national identity and social status, and disillusionment with established political elites.

=== Technological and economic disparities ===
The concentration of wealth and power among a small elite, as highlighted in works like Douglas Rushkoff's Survival of the Richest, contributes to the polycrisis by exacerbating social inequalities and undermining potential collective action to address the issues. The increasing gap between the wealthy and the rest of society raises questions about the sustainability of current economic models and the fairness of technological advancements that primarily benefit the elite.

=== Philosophical and existential dimensions ===
Some scholars frame the polycrisis in philosophical and existential terms. For example, Vanessa Machado de Oliveira, in Hospicing Modernity, highlights limits to human control and emphasizes the importance of acknowledging ecological and biological constraints. Such perspectives challenge the anthropocentric and individualistic assumptions which have long been central to Western culture.

== Counter-narrative ==
The term "polytunity" is not another expression of crises, but a counter-narrative that replaces the Western-centric, fear-driven framing behind the "polycrisis" narrative with a focus on agency and transformation, especially in the global majority and Gen Z. It was featured by the World Economic Forum in 2026.

== Other expressions of interconnected crises ==
These are alternative ways of expressing "polycrisis", distinguishing between different forms or layers of crisis. While highlighting how crises vary in scope, duration, and structural impact, their common focus is on naming the problem—overlapping crises that create systemic, even paralyzing challenges—rather than on solutions.

=== Permacrisis ===
A permacrisis refers to a prolonged state of instability where crises do not fully resolve but become quasi-permanent conditions. This term has been used to describe enduring situations such as chronic socioeconomic inequalities, continuous environmental degradation, or a perceived global democratic decline. It was declared the Collins Dictionary Word of the Year in 2022, amidst a period of inflation and political instability in Western Europe. While the "permacrisis" names the prolonged nature of crisis, the narrative does not call for transformation or bring attention to movements of change. Because the term tends to normalize persistent disruption, it can engender fatigue among institutions and the public, reducing both the political will and the societal capacity to enact long-term solutions.

=== Metacrisis ===
A metacrisis affects the foundational paradigms and cultural narratives of societies, including their core political, economic, or philosophical frameworks. Unlike a localized or sector-specific disturbance, a metacrisis calls into question the legitimacy or viability of prevailing systems. Examples include systemic critiques of liberal democracy or neoliberal capitalism—sparked by the perceived contradictions between egalitarian ideals and real-world exploitative practices—and philosophical reckonings with anthropocentrism, which challenge humanity's self-image relative to nature. Because metacrises require rethinking overarching worldviews, they are not easily addressed by policy or technical fixes, often necessitating deeper cultural and ethical shifts.

=== Systemic crisis ===
Systemic crises disrupt entire systems—economic, ecological, infrastructural—and commonly have rapid spillover effects across multiple domains. Examples include global supply chain collapses, as witnessed during the COVID-19 pandemic, where disruptions in one region triggered shortages worldwide; or acute energy shocks linked to geopolitical tensions, which may ripple across global markets, fueling inflation and social unrest. Systemic crises highlight the interdependencies of contemporary networks, where failures in one node can quickly cascade through others.

=== Geopolitical crisis ===
Since the 2020s, the planet is currently undergoing a period of global instability defined by the simultaneous collapse of the post–Cold War rules-based international order and the emergence of high intensity, interconnected regional wars. from Russo-Ukrainian war to the current multi-front military escalations in 2026, the era is characterized by the widespread marginalization of international law, the rise of decapitation strikes as a standard military doctrine, and the fracture of the global economy into competing geopolitical blocs, a period in which multiple, distinct global crises occur simultaneously in ways that amplify their severity and complexity. With the assassination of Ali Khamenei, the Supreme Leader of Iran, during joint U.S.-Israeli airstrikes in Tehran, making it the first death of a world leader during this era.

According to the political scientist Kristijan Kotarski, writing for European Liberal Forum's publication Future Europe Journal: "It seems that the proper way to characterise the events of the last few years is the age of polycrisis and permacrisis. Multiple crises are unfolding before our eyes simultaneously, such as the COVID-19 pandemic, Russia's brutal onslaught on Ukraine, the cost of living crisis, climate change, natural catastrophes, and the appearance of new disruptive technologies, to name just a few. There appears to be no end in sight to the extended period of insecurity and instability through which we are living."

== Responses and criticism ==
Some scholars argue that the concept of polycrisis, while useful, often reflects a Eurocentric view and overlooks how countries in the global South have long faced overlapping crises shaped by colonial histories and global inequalities.

Critics of the polycrisis narrative argue that it can lead to fatalism and inaction, suggesting instead a focus on practical, incremental changes that can build resilience and adaptability.

Various thought leaders and figureheads in the technology space have aligned themselves with effective accelerationism and have forcefully critiqued concepts related to the polycrisis, arguing that the way to solve most, if not all, of the problems facing humanity is through further economic growth and the acceleration of tech development and deployment. In 2023, venture capitalist and tech magnate Marc Andreessen published the Techno-Optimist Manifesto, arguing that technology is what creates wealth and happiness.

Our enemies are not bad people—but rather bad ideas.

Our present society has been subjected to a mass demoralization campaign for six decades—against technology and against life—under varying names like "existential risk", "sustainability", "ESG", "Sustainable Development Goals", "social responsibility", "stakeholder capitalism", "Precautionary Principle", "trust and safety", "tech ethics", "risk management", "de-growth", "the limits of growth".

— Marc Andreessen, Techno-Optimist Manifesto, 2023.

Various scholars have proposed different frameworks for understanding and responding to the polycrisis. Some advocate for a radical rethinking of modernity and a transition towards more sustainable and equitable ways of living. This includes adopting ecological wisdom from Indigenous cultures, reimagining economic systems, and embracing a deeper connection with the natural world.

== Examples ==
Displacement in parts of Africa has been cited as an example of polycrisis dynamics, where multiple interconnected crises reinforce each other. In regions such as the Sahel and the Horn of Africa, armed conflict, climate variability (including drought), and economic instability interact to drive large-scale and often protracted Displacement. These overlapping pressures can erode livelihoods, weaken state capacity, and increase vulnerability, illustrating how polycrisis conditions produce complex and cumulative impacts on human mobility.

== See also ==
- Polycrise — French Wikipedia article on the concept
- Anthropocene
- Dilemma
- Ecological crisis
- Ecological economics
- Ecospirituality
- Ethnoecology
- Hyperobjects
- Indigenous science
- Social trap
- Tragedy of the commons
