= ThriveDX =

Global cybersecurity education provider

ThriveDX (later IronCircle) was a global cybersecurity education provider. The company partnered with educational institutions and organizations to deliver online training bootcamps teaching cybersecurity, software development, information technology, AI coding, and various digital skills.

The company ceased operations in June, 2026.

== History ==
ThriveDX was founded in 1997 by Gil Adani and Dan Vigdor. Initially, the company operated under the name HackerU in Israel. In 2018, it expanded operations to the United States as HackerUSA, establishing an office in Coral Gables, Florida. The University of Miami and the University of Central Florida were among the first universities to partner with HackerUSA.

Initially, the company offered both in-person and online learning options. In 2020, following the COVID-19 pandemic and the ensuing digital transformation, HackerUSA transitioned almost exclusively to online learning delivery.

In 2021, HackerUSA rebranded to ThriveDX. That same year, the company acquired Cybint, an Israeli SaaS-based cyber education company.

In 2022, ThriveDX received investments from Prytek and NightDragon. ThriveDX also acquired Kontra Secure Coding in 2022, further expanding its offerings. In 2024, ThriveDX sold Kontra as part of a strategic investment in cybersecurity. In the same year, ThriveDX also acquired Lucy Security AG, an award-winning cybersecurity training company, to strengthen its portfolio and expand global offerings.

In 2025 ThriveDX rebranded as IronCircle. It abruptly ceased operation in June 2026, leaving students with partially-completed programs.

== Initiatives and partnerships ==
ThriveDX works with nonprofit organizations such as BlackGirlsHack, Hire Heroes USA, and OneTen to promote parity in technology. These collaborations involve sponsoring student scholarships, providing training opportunities, and offering talent placement services through ThriveDX programs. ThriveDX launched its Cyber Empowerment Fund in May 2023 to provide financial support for professional digital skills training, aiming to increase tech equity without incurring debt.

ThriveDX / IronCircle partnered with more than 20 universities, which lent their names and reputations to the company's programs and received a percentage of the revenue. IronCircle used the universities' logos and colors and its admissions representatives would emphasize the university partnerships. Yet the company operated with minimal oversight and did not need to follow the rules and regulations which protect university students. Statistics from University of Central Florida recorded that of 325 students finishing the program, 26 had found jobs within 6 months of completion.

== Awards and recognition ==
ThriveDX participated in the 2022 White House National Cyber Workforce and Education Summit and was acknowledged by the White House as a partner commitment for the National Cyber Workforce and Education Strategy (NCWES) in 2023. That same year, the company was named a Top Cybersecurity Education provider in North America and Security Training Platform of the Year.

In 2024, ThriveDX was named Market Leader - Cybersecurity Training at the 2024 Global Infosec Awards and listed on the GSV 150 as one of the Most Transformational Growth Companies in Digital Learning and Workforce Skills.
