= Internet-related prefixes =

Internet-denoting grammatical prefixes

Internet-related prefixes such as e-, i-, cyber-, info-, techno- and net- are added to a wide range of existing words to describe new, Internet- or computer-related flavors of existing concepts, often electronic products and services that already have a non-electronic counterpart. The adjective virtual is often used in a similar manner.

== Cyber-, e-, i, and virtual ==
=== "Cyber-" ===
Cyber- is derived from "[cybernetic]", from the Greek κυβερνητικός 'steersman'. Examples: cyberspace, cyberlaw, cyberbullying, cybercrime, cyberwarfare, cyberterrorism, cybersex, and cyberdelic. It is commonly used for policies and politics regarding computer systems and networks (as in the above cases), but also for information technology products and services. Further examples:

- Cyber crime, crime that involves computers and networks
  - Budapest Convention on Cybercrime, the first international treaty seeking to address Internet and computer crime, signed in 2001
  - Cybercrime countermeasures
- Cyber-attack, an offensive manoeuvre that targets computers
- Cyberbullying, bullying or harassment using electronic means
- Cybercafé, a business which provides internet access
- Cyberculture, emergent cultures based on the use of computer networks
  - Cybergoth sub-culture
  - Cybersex (colloquially)
- Cyberinfrastructure or computer networks
- Cybersecurity, or computer security
- Cybersex trafficking, the live streaming of coerced sexual acts and or rape
- Cyberstalking, use of the Internet or other electronic means to stalk or harass an individual, group, or organization
- Cyberterrorism, use of the Internet to carry out terrorism
- Cyberwarfare, the targeting of computers and networks in war
- Cyberabad, the western part of Hyderabad city which is one of top technological centers in India
- Cyberjaya, a planned city with a science park as its core in Greater Kuala Lumpur, Malaysia

=== "E-" ===
E-, standing for electronic, is used in the terms e-mail, e-commerce, e-business, e-banking, e-sports, e-paper, e-cigarette, e-car, e-girl, e-wallet, and e-book.

The lowercase initial e prefix was used as early as 1994 by eWorld, Apple's online service.

=== "i-" ===
i-, standing for internet, was used as early as 1994 by iVillage, an internet community site by and for women. More recent examples include the BBC's iPlayer, and Google's former iGoogle service. It has even been used by companies not in the IT sector for their websites, such as Coca-Cola's now-defunct icoke.com.

Apple Inc. is especially connected to the i- prefix. They first employed it for the iMac line of computers starting in 1998, and have since used it in many of their other product names, including iCal, iSync, iChat, iBook, iDVD, iLife, iMessage, iPod (and iPod Socks), iSight, iPhone, iWeb, iTunes, iCloud, and others. They have said it stands for "Internet". However, Steve Jobs said in 1998 that it stood for internet, individual, instruct, inform, and inspire.

Promotional materials for the 2004 film I, Robot, inspired by Isaac Asimov's short-story collection of the same name, utilized a lowercase i as a cultural reference to the rising popularity at that time of the prefix in product names.

The letter "i" was also used in the popular Nickelodeon show iCarly, as that show primarily uses the internet as its main theme, and to parodize the fact that Apple uses "i-" in almost all its products.

=== "Virtual" ===
The word virtual is used in a similar way to the prefixes above, but it is an adjective instead of a prefix. For example, it is used in the terms virtual reality, virtual world, and virtual sex.

== Linguistic behaviour ==
These prefixes are productive. Michael Quinion notes that most of these formations are nonce words that will never be seen again. He writes that new terms such as "e-health" are unneeded; in this case telemedicine already exists to describe the application of telecommunications to medicine. He similarly points out the redundancy of e-tail, e-commerce, and e-business. Martin likewise characterizes many of these words as "fad words" and believes many will disappear once the technology that resulted in their coinage becomes better accepted and understood. For example, he writes, "when using computers becomes the standard way to do business, there will be no need to call it 'e-business' — it may be just 'business.'"

== Spelling controversies ==
There is some confusion over whether these prefixes should be hyphenated and/or in upper case. In the case of e-mail, it was originally hyphenated and lowercase in general usage, but the hyphen is no longer common.

In 1999, Michael Quinion attributed the forms "email", "E-mail" and "Email" to uncertainty on the parts of newer Internet users. In 2003, Ronald Smith prescribed that the e- should always be lowercase and hyphenated. In 2013, the Associated Press Stylebook removed the hyphen from "e-mail", following the general usage of the word.

== History ==
The term 'cybernetics' was used in Norbert Wiener's book Cybernetics or Control and Communication in the Animal and the Machine (MIT Press, 1948). Wiener used the term in reference to the control of complex systems in the animal world and in mechanical networks, in particular self-regulating control systems. By 1960, doctors were performing research into surgically or mechanically augmenting humans or animals to operate machinery in space, leading to the coining of the term "cyborg", for "cybernetic organism".

In 1965, the ABPC The Avengers television series introduced artificial humanoids called Cybernauts. In 1966, the BBC Doctor Who serial The Tenth Planet introduced a monster called cybermen.

Fred J Cook (Winner of the 1961 Hillman Award) in his 1966 book "The Corrupted Land : The Social Morality of Modern America" introduces his book with "such ideals as free enterprise, 'rugged individualism' and laissez faire are anachronisms in this age of CYBERNATION."

By the 1970s, the Control Data Corporation (CDC) sold the "Cyber" range of supercomputers, establishing the word cyber- as synonymous with computing. Robert Trappl credits William Gibson and his novel Neuromancer with triggering a "cyber- prefix flood" in the 1980s.

McFedries observes that a backlash against the use of e- and cyber- can be traced to the late 1990s, quoting Hale and Scanlon requesting writers in 1999 to "resist the urge to use this vowel-as-cliché" when it comes to e- and calling cyber- "terminally overused".

A comparable usage from outside the English language is the Japanese prefix denki (電気), meaning electricity, which was used in Meiji-era Japan to denote products exhibiting a Western sensibility.
