= Cyberdelic =

Countercultural movement

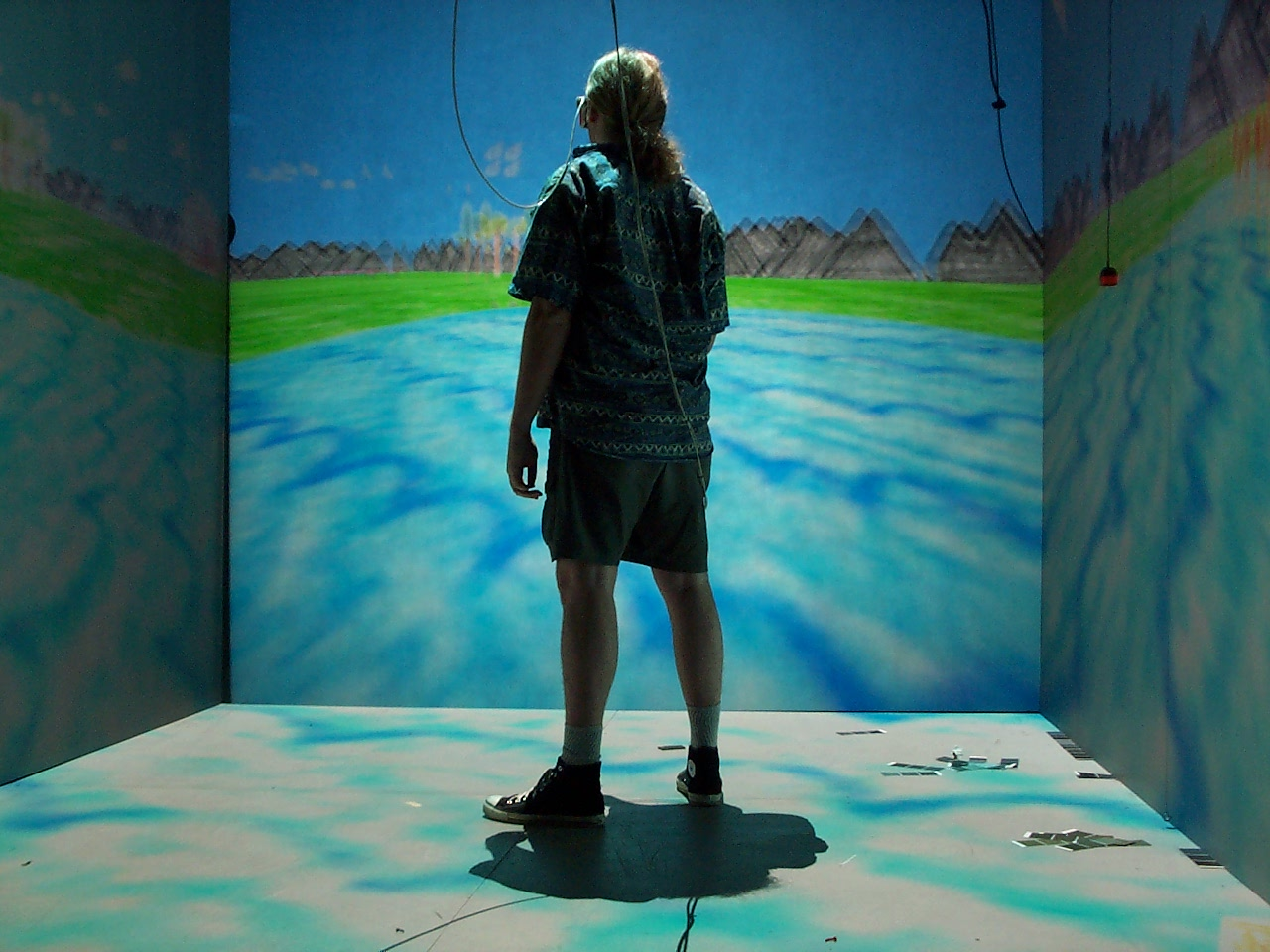
The cave automatic virtual environment is an immersive virtual reality environment that provides a "cyberdelic experience" where the user can contemplate perception, reality and illusion

Cyberdelic (a portmanteau of cyber and psychedelic) refers to a countercultural movement that emerged in the 1980s and 1990s through the convergence of cyberculture and psychedelic subculture. It explored the experiential and aesthetic possibilities of information technology, particularly personal computing, computer graphics, and electronic music, in dialogue with altered states of consciousness, visionary art, and rave culture.

Cyberdelic art commonly involved the computational generation of fractal and algorithmic forms, expressed through still images, animations, experimental audiovisual works, and underground electronic music. In social settings, cyberdelic expression became closely associated with rave and club scenes, where psychedelic trance music and related genres were accompanied by laser light shows, projected digital imagery, artificial fog, and immersive environments, with club drugs frequently present as part of the subculture’s practices.

== Advocates ==
Timothy Leary, an advocate of psychedelic drug use who became a cult figure of the hippies in the 1960s, reemerged in the 1980s as a spokesperson of the cyberdelic counterculture, whose adherents called themselves "cyberpunks", and became one of the most philosophical promoters of personal computers (PC), the Internet, and immersive virtual reality. Leary proclaimed that the "PC is the LSD of the 1990s" and admonished bohemians to "turn on, boot up, jack in".

In contrast to some of the hippies of the 1960s who were antiscience and antitechnology, the cyberpunks of the 1980s and 1990s embraced technophilia and hacker ethic. They believed that high technology (and smart drugs) could help human beings overcome limits, that it could liberate them from authority and even enable them to transcend space, time, and body. They often expressed their ethos and aesthetics through cyberart and reality hacking.

R. U. Sirius, co-founder and original editor-in-chief of Mondo 2000, became a prominent promoter of the cyberpunk ideology, whose adherents were pioneers in the IT industry of Silicon Valley and the West Coast of the United States.

In 1992, Billy Idol became influenced by the cyberdelic subculture and the cyberpunk fiction genre. The result of his passion for the ideals behind the culture resulted in his 1993 concept album, Cyberpunk, which Idol hoped would introduce Idol's fans and other musicians to the opportunities presented by digital technology and cyberculture. Timothy Leary and other members of the cyberdelic movement were contacted by Idol, and participated in the album's creation. The album was a critical and financial failure, and polarized online cyberculture communities of the period. Detractors viewed it as an act of co-optation and opportunistic commercialization. It was also seen as part of a process that saw the overuse of the term "cyberpunk" until the word lost meaning. Alternatively, supporters saw Idol's efforts as harmless and well-intentioned, and were encouraged by his new interest in cyberculture.

== Collapse ==
After the dot-com bubble of the late 1990s burst in 2000, the techno-utopianism that prevailed in the cyberdelic counterculture waned while technorealism grew. Most cyberpunks realized that the PC, the Internet, and other new technologies did not really bring the radical social, political, and personal changes they thought they would, specifically the "cybersociety" - a postpolitical, non-hierarchical society made possible by cyberware, in which the computer-literate, super-intelligent, open-minded, change-oriented, self-reliant, irreverent free-thinker is the norm and the person who is not internetted and does not think for themself and does not question authority is the "problem person".

Disillusioned, R. U. Sirius condemned cyberdelic escapism:

[...] Anybody who doesn't believe that we're trapped hasn't taken a good look around. We're trapped in a sort of mutating multinational corporate oligarchy that's not about to go away. We're trapped by the limitations of our species. We're trapped in time. At the same time identity, politics, and ethics have long turned liquid. [...] Cyberculture (a meme that I'm at least partly responsible for generating, incidentally) has emerged as a gleeful apologist for this kill-the-poor trajectory of the Republican revolution. You find it all over Wired ["the Rolling Stone of technology"] - this mix of chaos theory and biological modeling that is somehow interpreted as scientific proof of the need to devolve and decentralize the social welfare state while also deregulating and empowering the powerful, autocratic, multinational corporations. You've basically got the breakdown of nation states into global economies simultaneously with the atomization of individuals or their balkanization into disconnected sub-groups, because digital technology conflates space while decentralizing communication and attention. The result is a clear playing field for a mutating corporate oligarchy, which is what we have. I mean, people think it's really liberating because the old industrial ruling class has been liquefied and it's possible for young players to amass extraordinary instant dynasties. But it's savage and inhuman. Maybe the wired elite think that's hip. But then don't go around crying about crime in the streets or pretending to be concerned with ethics.

== See also ==
- Algorave
- Cybergoth
- Demoscene
- Fractal art
- Immersive technology
- Postcyberpunk
- Virtual world
