= Kanekalon =

Kanekalon could refer to:

- Synthetic fibers produced by Kaneka Corporation
- Synthetic dreads or other synthetic hair products made out of such material
