= Anders Sandberg =

Swedish computer scientist, futurist, transhumanist, and philosopher (born 11 July 1972)

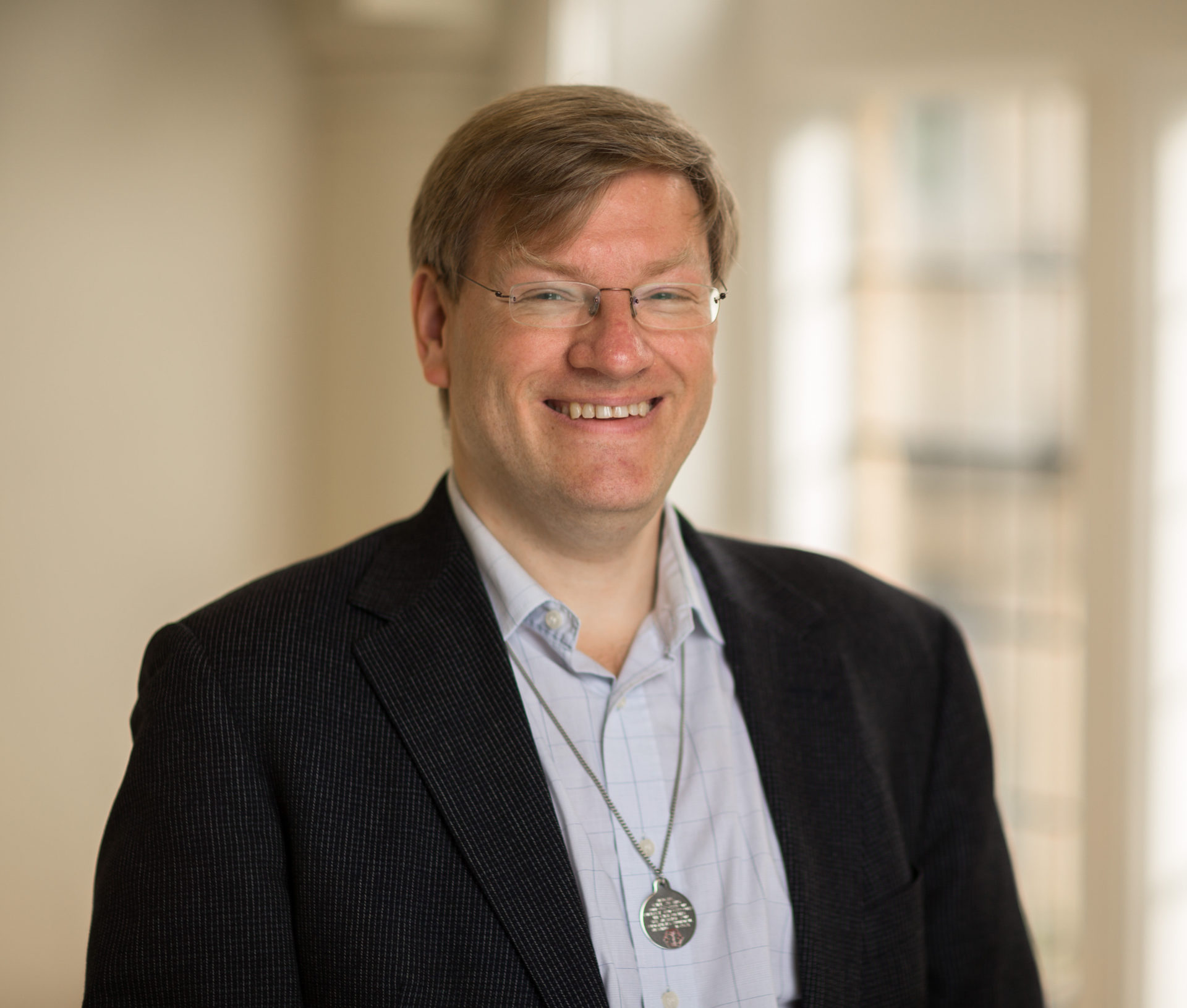
- Sandberg in 2016 wearing his medal with instructions to be cryonically preserved after death
- Born: 11 July 1972 (age 54); Solna, Sweden
- Education: Stockholm University (PhD in Computational Neuroscience)
- Occupations: Researcher, science debater, futurist, transhumanist and author
- Movement: Transhumanism
- Website: www.aleph.se

Anders Sandberg (born 11 July 1972) is a Swedish researcher, futurist and transhumanist. He holds a PhD in computational neuroscience from Stockholm University, and is a former senior research fellow at the Future of Humanity Institute at the University of Oxford.

== Work ==
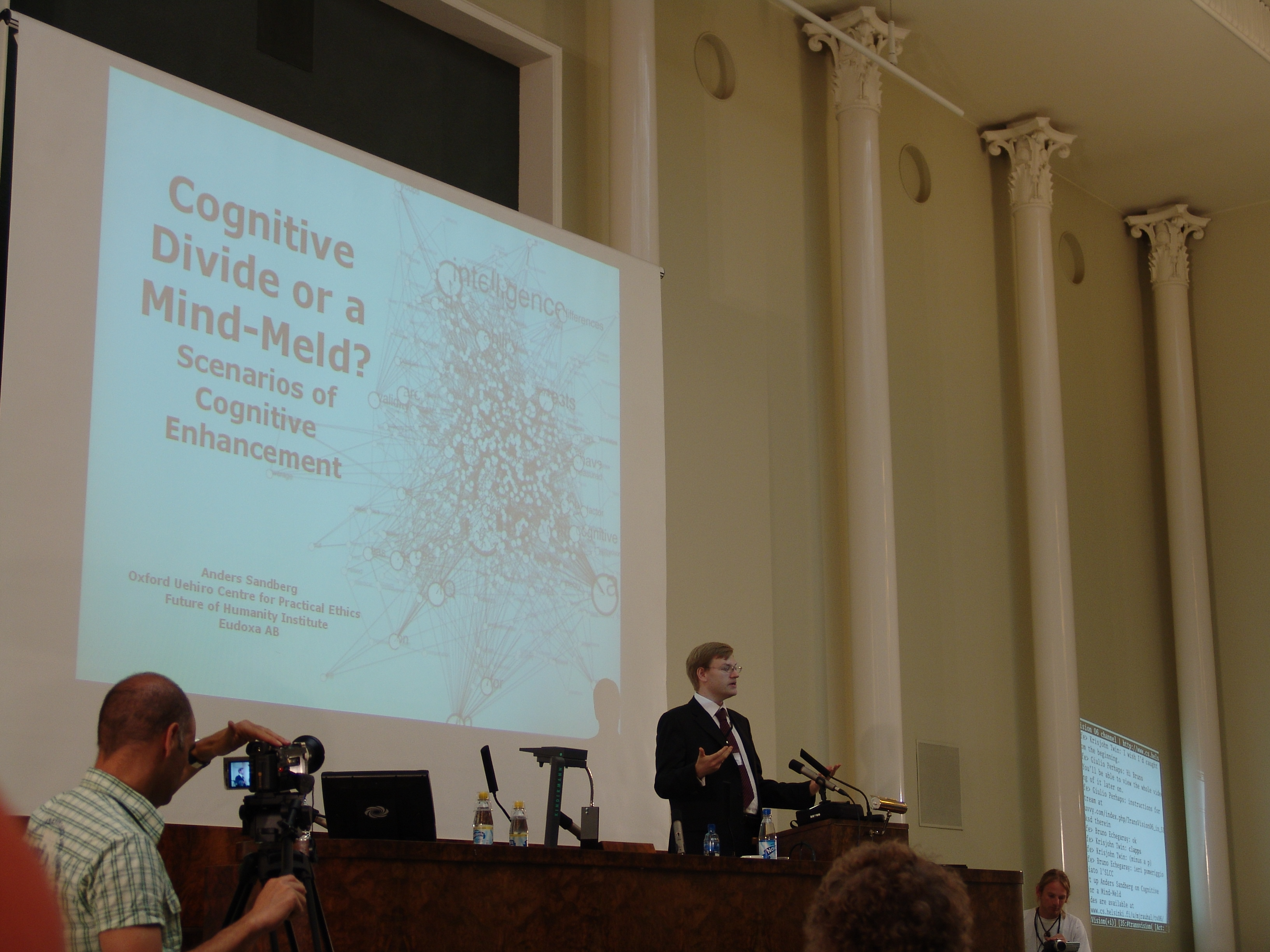
Sandberg at the University of Helsinki, in 2006

Sandberg's research centres on societal and ethical issues surrounding human enhancement and new technology, as well as on assessing the capabilities and underlying science of future technologies. His research includes work on cognitive enhancement (methods, impacts, and policy analysis) and technical roadmaps on whole brain emulation, neuroethics, and existential risks. He analysed how to take into account the subjective uncertainty in risk estimates of low-likelihood, high-consequence risk.

Sandberg is known as a researcher, participant and commentator in the public debate on human enhancement, neuroscience, ethics, and future studies.

He is co-founder of and writer for the think tank Eudoxa, and is a co-founder of the Orion's Arm collaborative worldbuilding project. Between 1996 and 2000 he was chairman of the Swedish Transhumanist Association. He was also the scientific producer for the neuroscience exhibition "Se Hjärnan!" ("Behold the Brain!"), organized by Swedish Travelling Exhibitions, the Swedish Research Council and the Knowledge Foundation, that toured Sweden in 2005–2006. In 2007 he was a postdoctoral research fellow at the Oxford Uehiro Centre for Practical Ethics, working on the EU-funded ENHANCE project on the ethics of human enhancement.

Sandberg is also an electronic artist, whose renderings have been adapted for book covers by futurist Damien Broderick: The Dreaming, Earth is But a Star, The Judas Mandala, Skiffy and Mimesis, Uncle Bones, Warriors of the Tao, and xyzt.

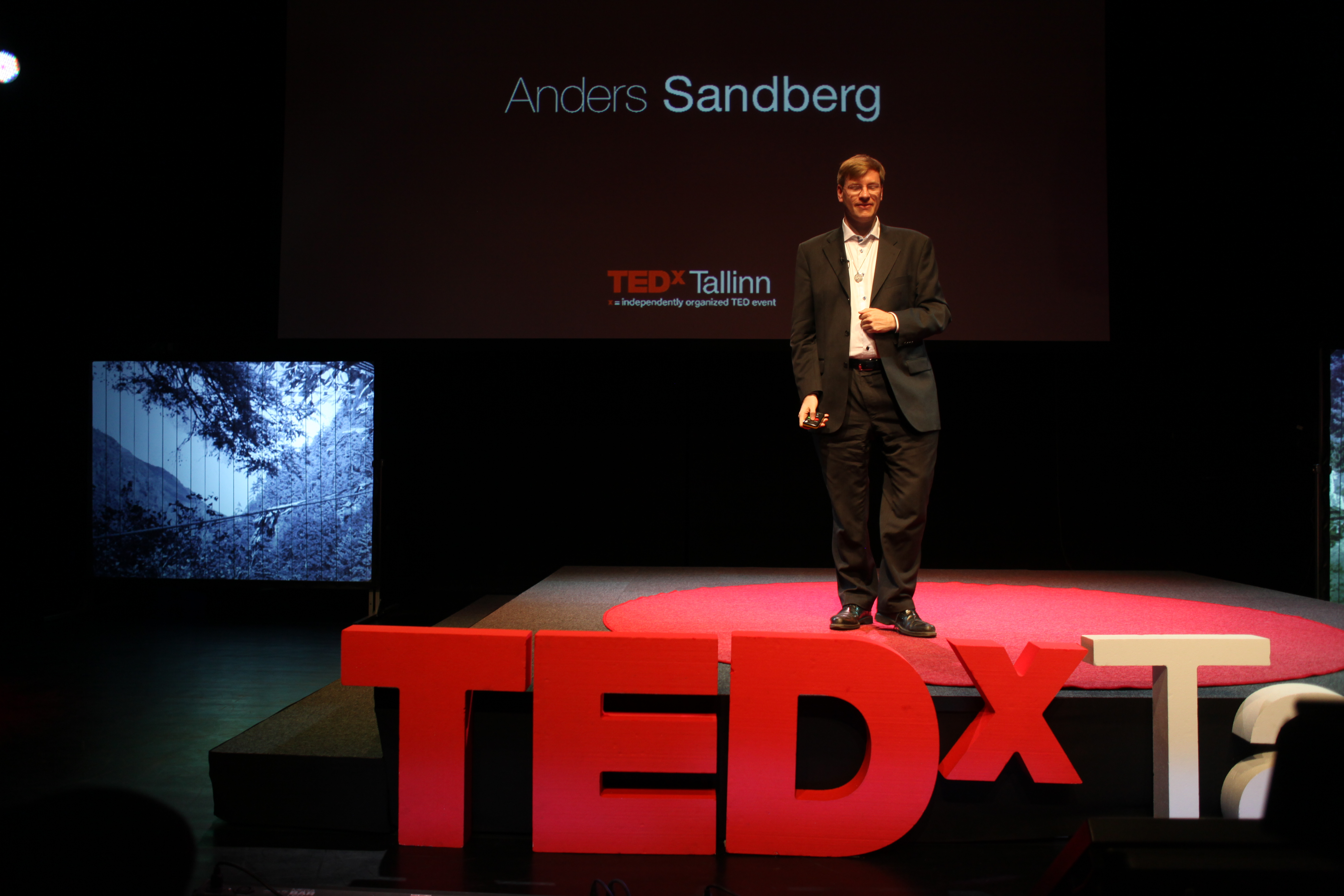
Sandberg at TEDxTallinn, in 2012

Sandberg has also supported and advocated cryonics, for example by signing an open letter to support research into cryonics and by being an advisor to the UK Cryonics and Cryopreservation Research Network, a UK advocacy group. He has personally arranged to be cryonically preserved after his death.

One of his 2014 papers, entitled "Ethics of Brain Emulations", became one of the most downloaded papers in the Journal of Experimental and Theoretical Artificial Intelligence, from a special volume edited by Vincent C. Müller.

With nanotechnologist Eric Drexler and philosopher Toby Ord in 2018 he published a paper entitled "Dissolving the Fermi Paradox". The paper was the first to estimate and rigorously take into account the uncertainties in each term in the Drake equation. These uncertainties, which often span multiple orders of magnitude, can be represented as probability distributions with long tails. Instead of getting a single estimate of the probability of life in our galaxy, they therefore obtained a distribution. They found that there is a high likelihood that we are alone in our galaxy or even alone in the entire observable universe, thus proposing a solution to the famous Fermi paradox, which asks why we do not see signs of intelligent life in the night sky.

In 2018, in response to a question on Physics Stack Exchange, Sandberg published a paper on arXiv entitled "Blueberry Earth", which answered the question, "What if the entire Earth was instantaneously replaced with an equal volume of closely packed, but uncompressed blueberries?" The paper got a large amount of news coverage on Slate, The Atlantic, Popular Mechanics, Atlas Obscura, and in other outlets.

== See also ==
- Future of Humanity Institute, University of Oxford
- Existential risk studies
- Transhumanism
- Longtermism
