= Centre for the Study of Existential Risk =

English existential risk research centre

- Formation: 2012; 14 years ago
- Founders: Huw Price; Martin Rees; Jaan Tallinn
- Purpose: Existential risk studies
- Headquarters: Cambridge, England
- Parent organization: University of Cambridge
- Website: cser.ac.uk

The Centre for the Study of Existential Risk (CSER) is a research centre at the University of Cambridge, intended to study possible extinction-level threats posed by present or future technology. The co-founders of the centre are Huw Price (Bertrand Russell Professor of Philosophy at Cambridge), Martin Rees (the Astronomer Royal and former President of the Royal Society) and Jaan Tallinn (co-founder of Skype, early investor to Anthropic).

== Areas of focus ==
=== Managing extreme technological risks ===
Risks are associated with emerging and future technological advances and impacts of human activity. According to CSER, managing these extreme technological risks is an urgent task - but one that poses particular difficulties and has been comparatively neglected in academia.

- CSER researchers developed a tool called TERRA to produce a bibliography of publications related to existential risks.
- CSER has held two international Cambridge Conferences on Catastrophic Risk. The Centre has also advised on the establishment of global risk projects at the Australia National University, the University of California, Los Angeles and the University of Warwick.
- CSER helped establish the first All-Party Parliamentary Group for Future Generations in the United Kingdom Parliament, bringing global risk and long-term thinking to UK political leaders.
- CSER has held over thirty workshops bringing together academia, policy and industry on topics including cybersecurity, nuclear security, climate change, and gene drives.
- CSER Public Lectures have been viewed over 500,000 times online.

=== Global catastrophic biological risks ===
- In 2017, CSER convened policy-makers and academics to identify challenges for the Biological Weapons Convention (BWC). A key issue identified was that the rapid rate of progress in relevant sciences and technologies has made it very difficult for governance bodies including the BWC to keep pace.
- CSER researchers ran a horizon-scanning exercise for 20 Emerging Issues in Biological Engineering drawing on 30 European and US experts. They presented the paper at the 2017 Meeting of States Parties to the BWC, and at the Science Advisory Board of the Organisation for the Prohibition of Chemical Weapons in 2018.

=== Extreme risks and the global environment ===
- Martin Rees and Partha Dasgupta, a senior advisor, have co-organised a series of influential workshops with the Vatican. The 2015 workshop influenced the Papal Encyclical on Climate Change, which in turn influenced the Paris Agreement on climate change. The 2017 workshop's findings will soon be published as a book on Biological Extinction.
- CSER researchers have published on biodiversity loss and governance in Nature, the environmental impact of high-yield farming and prospects for geoengineering.
- CSER researchers published a report calling for business school rankings to include sustainability. Four days later, the Financial Times announced a "complete review of our methodology."

=== Risks from advanced artificial intelligence ===
- In 2015 CSER helped organise a conference on the future directions of AI in Puerto Rico, resulting in an Open Letter on Artificial Intelligence signed by research leaders worldwide calling for research on ensuring that AI systems are safe and societally beneficial.
- In 2016, CSER launched its first spin-off: the Leverhulme Centre for the Future of Intelligence (CFI). Led by Professor Price, CFI focuses on the opportunities and challenges posed by AI.
- From 2017 onwards, CSER has organized a series of academic conferences bringing together Decision Theory and AI safety.
- In 2018, with partners from tech companies and security think-tanks, CSER published The Malicious Use of Artificial Intelligence: Forecasting, Preventing and Mitigation, on the implications of AI for physical and cybersecurity. They also published An AI Race: Rhetoric and Risks, which won the inaugural Best Paper prize at the 2018 AAAI/ACM AI Ethics and Society conference.

== Media coverage ==
Media coverage includes a profile in Wired UK in 2017, and in Science in 2018.

== See also ==
- Bulletin of the Atomic Scientists
- Future of Humanity Institute
- Future of Life Institute
- Johns Hopkins Center for Health Security
- Machine Intelligence Research Institute
- Nuclear Threat Initiative
