= Fluffy (footwear) =

Furry footwear fashion accessory

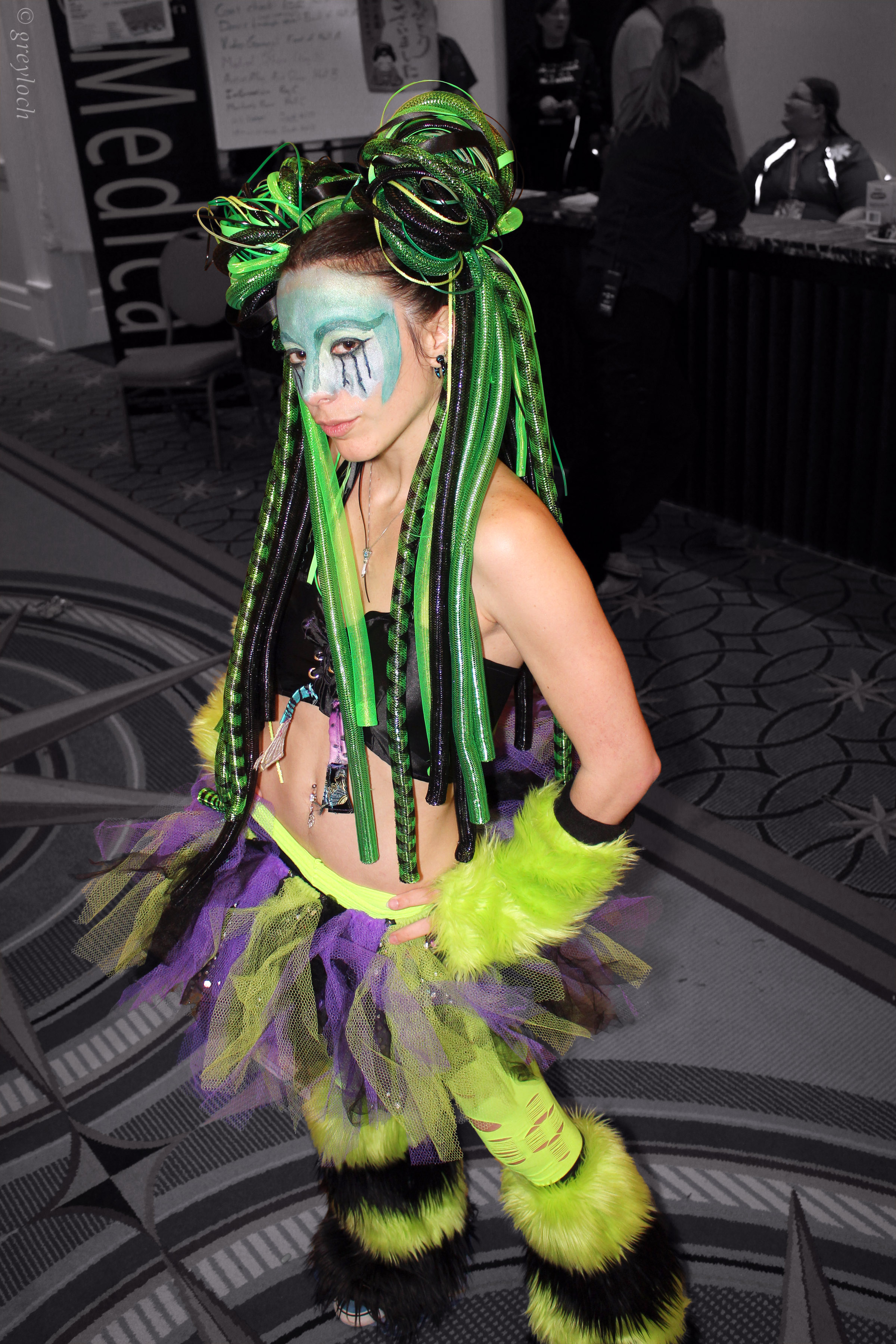
A girl in a cyber outfit wearing green and black furry leg warmers

A fluffy, also known as a furry leg warmer or furry boot cover, is a type of footwear fashion accessory. It is a variation on a leg warmer normally made out of faux fur that covers the user's main footwear. It is commonly associated with cybergoth fashion and the rave scene. Fluffies originated in the Ibiza rave scene of the mid-to-late-1990s, where podium dancers wore them during their performances.
