= Guillaume Verdon =

Canadian physicist and entrepreneur

- Born: Guillaume Verdon-Akzam; Montreal, Quebec, Canada
- Other name: BasedBeffJezos
- Citizenship: Canadian
- Education: McGill University (BS); University of Waterloo (MMath)
- Years active: 2013-present
- Known for: Founder, Extropic AI; Effective accelerationism; Quantum Machine Learning

Guillaume Verdon-Akzam, also known as Guillaume Verdon or Gill Verdon, is a Canadian mathematical physicist, quantum computing researcher, entrepreneur, and writer who is a key contributor of Google's quantum machine learning software, Tensorflow Quantum.

He is also a co-founder of the effective accelerationism movement and the start-up company Extropic AI which operates at the intersection between physics-based computing and artificial intelligence.

== Education and career ==
Verdon attended McGill University as an undergraduate and graduated with honors with a double major in Mathematics & Physics. He attended University of Waterloo for graduate studies where he completed Master's work in 2017 at the Institute for Quantum Computing and continued with Achim Kempf as his PhD supervisor. He was also given the IQC Entrance Award at Waterloo. Verdon presented papers as a Guest Speaker at NASA's 2018 Adiabatic Quantum Computing conference.

In 2017, Verdon co-founded Everettian Technologies and served as its chief scientific officer. The company was named after Hugh Everett III, and was an early Canadian start-up focused on quantum machine learning solutions. He also had a side venture into NFTs related to quantum information, which provided capital for his later startup Extropic AI. Verdon has worked at Google and had primary responsibility for theoretical work on the team that introduced the TensorFlow Quantum library for quantum machine learning. During his time at Google X, Verdon introduced and worked on quantum graph neural networks, and quantum Hamiltonian-based models. He has several patents with Google X covering quantum computing, quantum machine learning, and signal processing.

In 2022, Verdon and Trevor Mccourt co-founded Extropic AI, which focuses on building a thermodynamic hardware platform for accelerating AI research and announced the next year the completion of a $14.1 million seed round. Extropic AI was initially operating in stealth-mode and said that it was focused on building chips specifically intended for running LLMs. In 2025, Wired reported that Verdon was continuing to work through Extropic AI on a new kind of chip that handles probabilistic bits instead of deterministic bits.

== Views ==
Verdon wrote under the pseudonym BasedBeffJezos and was a co-founder of the effective accelerationism (e/acc) movement. The origin of the movement can be traced back to a May 2022 newsletter published by him and 3 other authors. In its coverage of the movement, Forbes outed Verdon as the author behind his pseudonymous account. Since his naming, he has publicly spoken on podcasts and debated with those who have conflicting views on AI safety (such as Connor Leahy) and other issues of technological progress.

In a November 2026 post, he stated that the Democratic Party was allying with "Islamo-Communists" to destroy the United States.
