= Cybergoth =

Fashion subculture of goth and cyberpunk

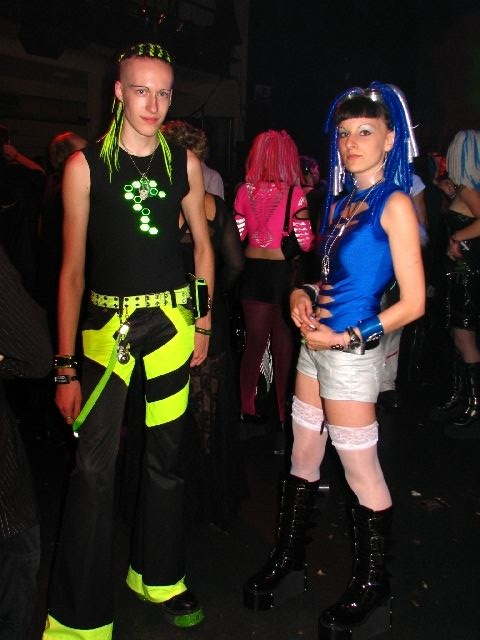
An example of cybergoth fashion

Cybergoth is a subculture that derives from elements of goth, raver, rivethead and cyberpunk fashion. Cybergoth was particularly prevalent from the late 1990s through the 2000s; however, its popularity has since declined.

Opinion differs as to whether cybergoth has the requisite complexity to constitute a subculture, with some commentators suggesting that it is no more than a small aesthetic variation on cyberpunk or raver fashion.

== History ==
The term "cybergoth" was coined in 1988 by Games Workshop for their roleplaying game Dark Future; however, the fashion style of the same name did not emerge until the following decade. Valerie Steele quotes Julia Borden, who defines cybergoth as combining elements of industrial aesthetics with a style associated with "Gravers" (Gothic ravers). Gravers hybridized "the British Raver look and the German ClubKid look with a 'freak show' spin." as well as a fusion between German and Austrian styles. Borden indicates that initially the hair extensions and bright fishnets did not mesh well with goth fashion, but that by 2002 "the rave elements of dress were replaced by Industrial-influenced accessories, such as goggles, reflective clothing, and mostly black clothing." Steele summarizes:

Today cyber goths tend to wear primarily black clothing with hints of neon colors, as well as clothing made of reflective materials and PVC, and huge platform boots. Their hair extensions or falls often incorporate a bright color and multiple piercings are typical. Goggles are often worn. Some cyber goths also wear gas masks or (in what appears to be a kind of medical fetish) shiny PVC doctors' masks.

== Fashion ==
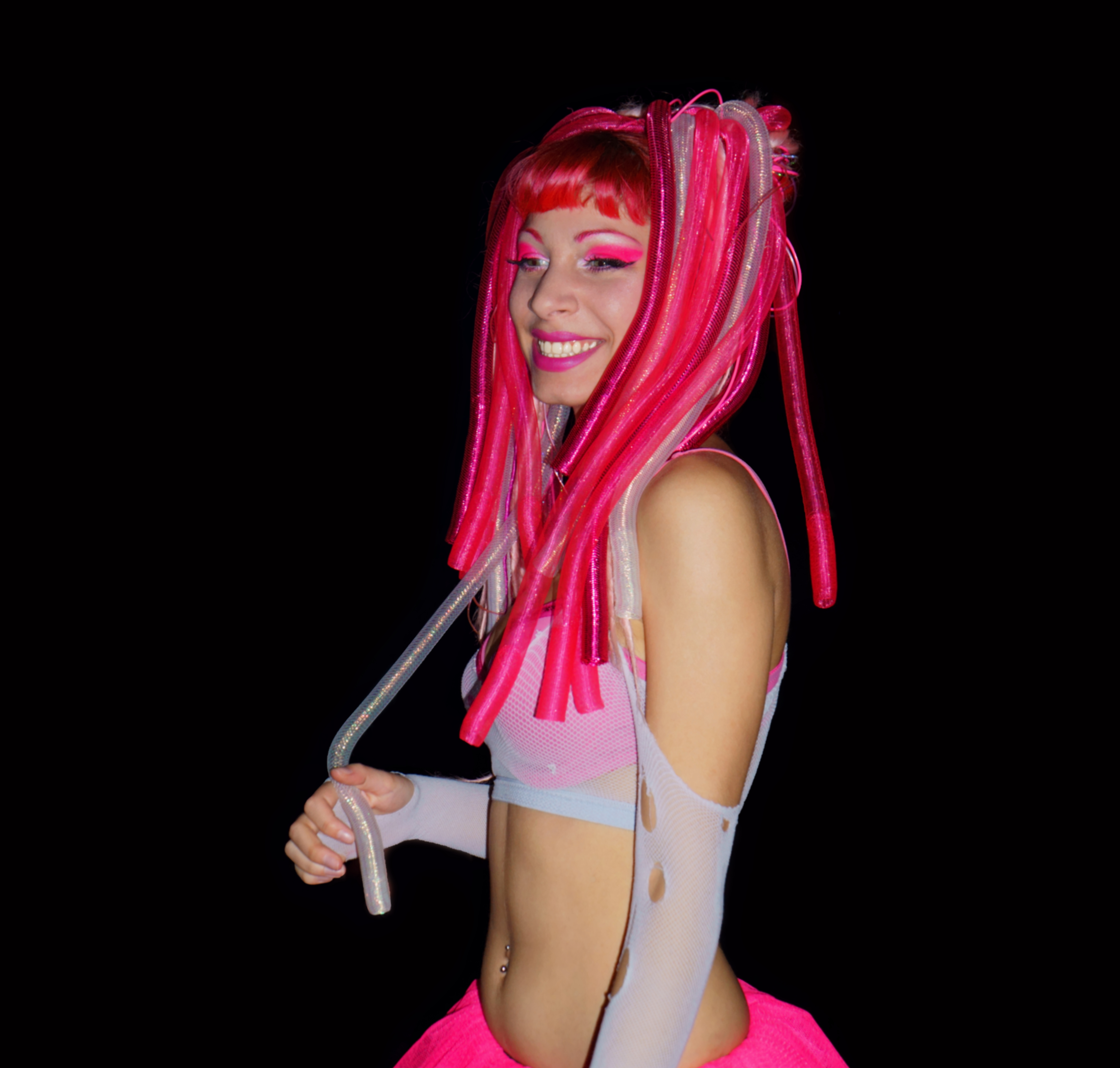
A woman dressed in a cybergoth outfit

Cybergoth fashion combines rave, rivethead, cyberpunk and goth fashion, as well as drawing inspiration from other forms of science fiction. Androgyny is common. The style sometimes features one starkly contrasting bright or neon-reactive theme color, such as red, blue, neon green, chrome, or pink, set against a basic, black gothic outfit. Matte or glossy black materials such as rubber and shiny black PVC can be mixed and matched in an effort to create a more artificial look.

The black-and-monochromatic juxtaposition can take a variety of forms, including brightly colored hair and make-up, cybernetic patterns such as live LED circuit boards, body modification, gas masks and goggles (especially aviator-style), typically worn on the forehead or around the neck rather than on the eyes. The most common use of a theme color is in the hair or eye make-up. Artificial, extended hair or "falls" are sometimes used to create this added effect. Falls can be made of various materials, ranging from yarn to fluorescent tubing to electrical wiring. Popular club gear for cybergoths includes tight black pants, tight black vests or shirts cut from ripped, solid or fishnet fabrics, fluffies, resembling costumes from 19th century Gothic novels or early black and white horror films from the mid-20th century. Companies that specialize in the style include Cyberdog (UK), DANE (UK), Pen & Lolly Clubwear (UK), Lip Service (US), and Diabolik (CA).

== Hair ==
Cybergoth style incorporates extravagant hair pieces and styles, including synthetic dreadlocks (known as cyberlox), hair extensions and so on. These hair pieces can be made of a variety of materials, from real hair to synthetic kanekelon hair, plastic tubing, tubular crin, rubber and foam strips, belts, and are often accented with goggles.

== See also ==
- Club Kids
- Cyberculture
- Cyberpunk
- Cyberdelic
- Industrial music
  - Futurepop
  - Aggrotech
  - Electronic Body Music
- PVC clothing
