= Leverhulme Centre for the Future of Intelligence =

University of Cambridge research centre

- Motto: Exploring the impact of artificial Intelligence
- Parent institution: University of Cambridge
- Founder: Leverhulme Trust
- Established: 2016; 10 years ago
- Mission: "Ensure that we humans make the best of the opportunities of artificial intelligence as it develops over coming decades"
- Focus: Artificial intelligence
- Directors: Rachel Adams (Executive Director); Stephen Cave (Academic Director)
- Key people: Huw Price; Stuart J. Russell
- Endowment: £10 million
- Location: 16 Mill Lane, Cambridge, England, UK
- Website: lcfi.ac.uk

The Leverhulme Centre for the Future of Intelligence (CFI) is an interdisciplinary research centre within the University of Cambridge that studies artificial intelligence. It is funded by the Leverhulme Trust. As of 2026, the centre is led by executive director Rachel Adams, with Stephen Cave serving as academic director.

The Centre brings together academics from the fields of computer science, philosophy, social science and others. The centre is based at the University of Cambridge, with spokes at Imperial College London and the University of California, Berkeley.

== Programmes ==
The CFI research is structured in a series of programmes and research exercises. The topics of the programmes range from algorithmic transparency to exploring the implications of AI for democracy.

- AI: Futures and Responsibility
- AI: Trust and Society
- Kinds of Intelligence
- AI: Narrative and Justice
- Philosophy and Ethics of AI

In July 2019, Leverhulme released the Animal-AI Olympics competition, featuring tests ordinarily used to test animal intelligence.

== See also ==
- Centre for the Study of Existential Risk
- Future of Humanity Institute
- Future of Life Institute
- Machine Intelligence Research Institute
