= Dave Troy =

American entrepreneur, disinformation researcher, and investigative journalist

- Born: David Troy; December 1971 (age 54); Maryland, United States
- Education: Johns Hopkins University (BA, 1996)
- Occupations: Entrepreneur, investigative journalist, disinformation researcher, podcaster
- Years active: 1986–present
- Employer(s): America 2.0 (publisher and editor); 410 Labs (CEO)
- Known for: Research on disinformation and information warfare, curator of TEDxMidAtlantic, first developer to use the Twitter API
- Spouse: Married
- Children: 2
- Website: davetroy.com

Dave Troy (born December 1971) is an American technology entrepreneur, disinformation researcher, and investigative journalist. In his investigative journalism he focuses on information warfare, extremism, and threats to democracy.

== Early life and education ==
Dave Troy grew up in Severna Park, a suburb of Baltimore. He was introduced to computers at the age of seven and began programming. In 1984, at the age of twelve, he launched his own bulletin board system (BBS), initially using his family's telephone line.

From 1985 to 1989, he attended the private college-preparatory Severn School in Severna Park. In 1996, he earned a bachelor's degree in liberal arts from Johns Hopkins University in Baltimore.

In a 1990 interview concerning his business activities, he stated that he had become a Republican, although he described himself as a liberal and preferred to characterize himself as a free-market idealist.

== Business career ==
In 1986, during his sophomore year of high school, Troy co-founded Toad Computers with a friend at the age of 14. The company specialized in mail-order sales of Atari ST computers. In 1995, he founded ToadNet, which became a leading regional provider of Internet access and hosting services. He sold the successful company in 2004. Beginning in 2003, he worked on open-source projects and large-scale voice over IP and call-center systems.

In 2007, he launched Twittervision and Flickrvision, projects for visualizing data from social media. Twittervision was officially recognized as the first application to use the Twitter API. Both projects were included in the 2008 exhibition Design and the Elastic Mind at the Museum of Modern Art in New York City.

In 2008, he created Twitter Vote Report, a platform that enabled voters to report polling-place wait times and irregularities through digital and mobile channels during the U.S. presidential election. Developed with volunteers, it was promoted by media outlets including NPR and attracted widespread public participation.

He became a coordinator and promoter of Baltimore's technology scene. In 2009, he co-founded Beehive Baltimore, the city's first coworking space, and the angel investment group Baltimore Angels. That same year, he co-founded the TEDxMidAtlantic conference, for which he serves as curator. In 2010, he co-founded the technology company 410 Labs, where he serves as CEO and product architect.

== Research and investigative journalism ==
Since 2007, Troy has conducted systematic analysis of social media data. His research spans the fields of sociology, network science, and political science. As part of the Future Frontlines program at the New America Foundation, he was particularly involved in research into events related to the January 6 attack on the United States Capitol in 2021.

His investigative journalism focuses on threats to democracy, information warfare, extremism, and the historical context of contemporary political developments. In November 2024, he founded the independent investigative platform America 2.0 where he serves as its publisher and editor-in-chief. He writes "The Wide Angle" column for the American digital magazine Washington Spectator and contributes to investigative media outlets such as the British Byline Times.

He speaks at conferences including TED and TEDx, and appears in the media and on investigative podcasts. Since 2022, he has hosted the podcast Dave Troy Presents.

== Personal life ==
Dave Troy lives in Baltimore. He is married and has two adult children. He is a certified private pilot.
