= Internet culture =

Culture that has emerged from the use of computer networks

Internet culture refers to culture developed and maintained among frequent and active users of the internet (also known as netizens) who primarily communicate with one another as members of online communities; that is, a culture whose influence is "mediated by computer screens" and information communication technology, specifically the internet.

Internet culture arises from the frequent interactions between members within various online communities and the use of these communities for communication, entertainment, business, and recreation. Studied aspects of internet culture include anonymity/pseudonymity, social media, gaming and specific communities, such as fandoms.

== History ==
The internet developed in parallel with rapid and sustained technological advances in computing and data communication. Widespread access to the internet emerged as the cost of infrastructure dropped by several orders of magnitude with consecutive technological improvements.

Though internet culture originated during the creation and development of early online communities – such as those found on bulletin board systems before the internet reached mainstream adoption in developed countries – many cultural elements have roots in other previously existing offline cultures and subcultures which predate the internet. Specifically, internet culture includes many elements of telegraphy culture (especially amateur radio culture), gaming culture and hacker culture.

Initially, digital culture tilted toward the Anglosphere. As a result of the internet being a British–American invention and computer technology's early reliance on textual coding systems that were mainly adapted to the English language, Anglophone societies—followed by other societies with languages based on Latin script—enjoyed privileged access to digital culture. However, other languages have gradually grown in prominence. In specific, the proportion of content on the internet that is in English has dropped from roughly 80% in the 1990s to around 52.9% in 2018.

One cultural antecedent of internet culture was amateur radio (commonly known as ham radio). By connecting over great distances, ham operators were able to form a distinct cultural community with a strong technocratic foundation, as the radio gear involved was finicky and prone to failure. The area that later became Silicon Valley, where much of modern internet technology originates, had been an early locus of radio engineering. Alongside the original mandate for robustness and resiliency, the renegade spirit of the early ham radio community later infused the cultural value of decentralization and near-total rejection of regulation and political control that characterized the internet's original growth era, with strong undercurrents of the Wild West spirit of the American frontier.

At its inception in the early 1970s as part of ARPANET, digital networks were small, institutional, arcane, and slow, which confined the majority of use to the exchange of textual information, such as interpersonal messages and source code. Access to these networks was largely limited to a technological elite based at a small number of prestigious universities; the original American network connected one computer in Utah with three in California.

Text on these digital networks usually encoded in the ASCII character set, which was minimalistic even for established English typography, barely suited to other European languages sharing a Latin script (but with an additional requirement to support accented characters), and entirely unsuitable to any language not based on a Latin script, such as Mandarin, Arabic, or Hindi.

Interactive use was discouraged except for high value activities. Hence a store and forward architecture was employed for many message systems, functioning more like a post office than modern instant messaging; however, by the standards of postal mail, the system (when it worked) was stunningly fast and cheap. Among the heaviest users were those actively involved in advancing the technology, most of whom implicitly shared much the same base of arcane knowledge, effectively forming a technological priesthood.

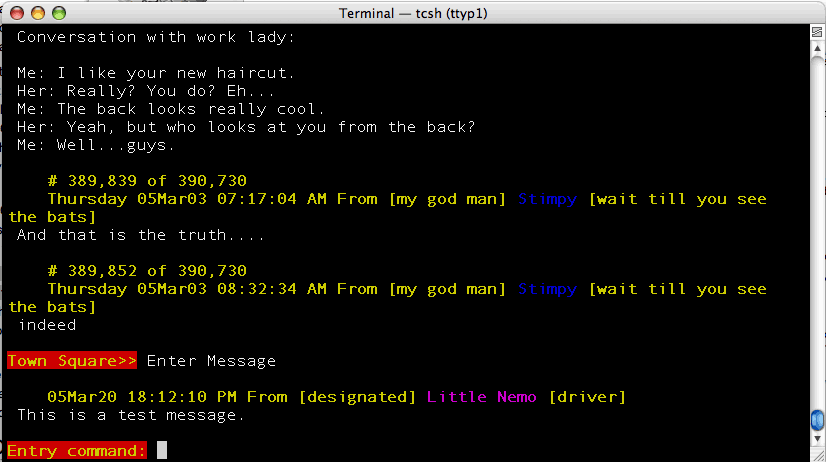
A screenshot of a bulletin board system

The origins of social media predate the internet proper. The first bulletin board system was created in 1978, GEnie was created by General Electric in 1985, the mailing list Listserv appeared in 1986, and Internet Relay Chat was created in 1988. The first official social media sites, SixDegrees and Classmates.com launched in 1997.

In the 1980s, the network grew to encompass most universities and many corporations, especially those involved with technology, including heavy but segregated participation within the American military–industrial complex. Use of interactivity grew, and the user base became less dominated by programmers, computer scientists and hawkish industrialists, but it remained largely an academic culture centered around institutions of higher learning. It was observed that each September, with an intake of new students, standards of productive discourse would plummet until the established user base brought the influx up to speed on cultural etiquette.

Commercial internet service providers (ISPs) emerged in 1989 in the United States and Australia, opening the door for public participation. Soon the network was no longer dominated by academic culture, and the term eternal September, initially referring to September 1993, was coined as internet slang for the endless intake of cultural newbies.

Commercial use became established alongside academic and professional use, beginning with a sharp rise in unsolicited commercial e-mail commonly called spam. Around this same time, the network transitioned to support the burgeoning World Wide Web. Multimedia formats such as audio, graphics, and video become commonplace and began to displace plain text, but multimedia remained painfully slow for dial-up users. Also around this time the internet also began to internationalize, supporting most of the world's major languages, but support for many languages remained patchy and incomplete into the 2010s.

On the arrival of broadband access, file sharing services grew rapidly, especially of digital audio (with a prevalence of bootlegged commercial music) with the arrival of Napster in 1999 and similar projects which effectively catered to music enthusiasts, especially teenagers and young adults, soon becoming established as a prototype for rapid evolution into modern social media. Alongside ongoing challenges to traditional norms of intellectual property, business models of many of the largest internet corporations evolved into what Shoshana Zuboff terms surveillance capitalism. Not only is social media a novel form of social culture, but also a novel form of economic culture where sharing is frictionless, but personal privacy has become a scarcity. In 1998, there was Hampster Dance, the first successful internet meme.

== Identity ==
One early study, conducted from 1998 to 1999, found that the participants view information obtained online as slightly more credible than information from magazines, radio, and television, information obtained from newspapers was the most credible. Credibility online is established in much the same way that it is established in the offline world. Lawrence Lessig claimed that the architecture of a given online community may be the most important factor in establishing credibility. Factors include: anonymity, connection to physical identity, comment rating system, feedback type (positive vs positive/negative), moderation.

=== Anonymity ===
Many sites allow anonymous commentary, where the user-id attached to the comment may be labelled as a "guest" or any other sort of automatic name. In an architecture that allows anonymous commentary, credibility attaches only to the object of the comment. Sites that require some link to an identity may require only a nickname that is sufficient to allow comment readers to rate the commenter, either explicitly, or by informal reputation. However with the rise of oftentimes "careless" spreading of personal data with the integration of the internet into society, and the rise of concepts like the digital footprint, anonymity, while still possible, has decreased.

=== Connection to physical identity ===
Architectures can require that physical identity be associated with commentary, as in Lessig's example of Counsel Connect. However, to require linkage to a physical identity, sensitive information about a user must be collected and safeguards for that collected information must be established – users must place sufficient trust in the site. Irrespective of safeguards, as with Counsel Connect, use of physical identities links credibility across the frames of the internet and real space, influencing the behaviors of those who contribute in those spaces. However, even purely online identities can establish credibility. Even though nothing inherently links a person or group to their internet-based persona, credibility can be earned, because of the time required.

=== Comment rating system ===
In some architectures, commenters can, in turn, be rated by other users, potentially encouraging more responsible commentary, although the profusion of popular shitposters belies this.

=== Feedback type ===
Architectures can be oriented around positive feedback or allow both positive and negative feedback. This feedback can take form through likes or upvotes, dislikes or downvotes, emoji reactions, rating systems, and written responses like comments or reviews. While a particular user may be able to equate certain responses with a "negative" evaluation, the actual meaning may be contextual.

=== Moderation ===
Architectures can give editorial control to a group or individual not employed by the site (e.g., Reddit), termed moderators. Moderation may be either proactive (previewing contents) or reactive (punishing violators).

The moderator's credibility can be damaged by overly aggressive behavior.

== See also ==
- Anonymous
- Cicada 3301
- Creepypasta
- Cyber law
- Cyberdelic
- Cyberpunk
- Digitalism
- Doomscrolling
- Information ethics
- Infosphere
- Internet trolls
- Meme
- Netnography
- Postliterate society
- Rules of the Internet
- Technology and society
- Techno-progressivism
- Technocriticism
- Technolibertarianism
- Technorealism
- Terminally online
