= Techno-Optimist Manifesto =

2023 manifesto for effective accelerationism

The "Techno-Optimist Manifesto" is a 2023 self-published essay by venture capitalist Marc Andreessen. The essay argues that many significant problems of humanity have been solved with the development of technology, particularly technology without any constraints, and that we should do everything possible to accelerate technological advancement. Technology, according to Andreessen, is what drives wealth and happiness. The essay is considered a manifesto for effective accelerationism.

== Background ==
Andreessen grew up in Wisconsin and studied computer science at the University of Illinois Urbana-Champaign (UIUC). During this time, he interned at IBM and worked at the National Center for Supercomputing Applications where, in 1993, he co-created NCSA Mosaic, one of the first web browsers. He went on to found Netscape, which produced the first commercial web browser, Netscape Navigator. Andreessen began blogging from 2007 to 2009, co-founding the venture capital firm Andreessen Horowitz that same year, later becoming known for its wide-ranging investments in established tech and cryptocurrency companies. In August 2011, The Wall Street Journal published Andreessen's essay "Why Software is Eating the World", his theory outlining a "technological and economic shift in which software companies are poised to take over large swathes of the economy". At the beginning of the COVID-19 pandemic, in April 2020, Andreessen wrote "It's Time To build", arguing for new investment in US infrastructure across every sector. In April 2022, Andreessen contacted Elon Musk about becoming a co-investor in his Twitter takeover, with Andreessen Horowitz later contributing $400 million to the effort. By September 2022, Andreessen was said to be worth an estimated $1.35 billion.

Around this same time, after Elon Musk acquired Twitter in October, anonymous Twitter accounts began spreading and popularizing the concept of effective accelerationism (e/acc), a reaction to the effective altruism movement supported by Sam Bankman-Fried, who was arrested in late December 2022. Proponents of e/acc believe that instead of giving money to charity, it should be given to tech companies; adherents of e/acc argue that tech innovation and progress is philanthropic by its very nature, as it helps humanity through its profit-driven, market-based product development, and should be free from regulations to help it and humanity thrive together. Podcaster Dwarkesh Patel published an interview with Andreessen about many of these related topics in February 2023, followed by Andreessen publishing the essay "Why AI Will Save the World" in June of that same year, accusing critics of unregulated AI of perpetuating a moral panic. In his essay, Andreessen argues that those who believe in regulating AI (Note: Sue Halpern: "The fact is, more than 70 percent of Americans, both Democrat and Republican, favor the establishment of standards to test and ensure the safety of artificial intelligence, according to a survey conducted by the analytics consultancy Ipsos [in November 2023]. An earlier Ipsos poll found that 83 percent “do not trust the companies developing AI systems to do so responsibly,” a view that was also held across the political spectrum. Even so, as shown by both the Republican platform and a reported draft executive order on AI prepared by Trump advisers that would require an immediate review of “unnecessary and burdensome regulations,” public concern is no match for corporate dollars.") due to perceived existential risks are part of a cult.

== Development ==
By late 2023, Andreessen, formerly a supporter of the Democratic Party, was said to have grown politically disillusioned with the Biden administration due to the volatility in the technology space for venture capitalists. The new environment was attributed to the imposition of antitrust laws on the tech sector and a renewed push for regulation of cryptocurrency, a sector in which Andreessen Horowitz was deeply invested in as a firm. The added scrutiny given to the tech sector in the wake of the Bankman-Fried scandal was also a contributing factor to Andreessen's newfound thinking. According to The New York Times, Biden's proposed "billionaire minimum income tax" led Andreessen to shift his political alliances to the Trump campaign. In October, Andreessen composed his thoughts and posted the "Techno-Optimist Manifesto" essay online. Dwarkesh Patel, who had previously interviewed Andreessen at the beginning of the year, responded to the manifesto with criticism and counterarguments, leading Andreessen to permanently block Patel on Twitter.

== Description ==
On October 16, 2023, Andreessen posted a 5,200 word essay to the Andreessen Horowitz (a16z) website. It is composed of approximately 108 statements divided into 15 parts: Lies; Truth; Technology; Markets; The Techno-Capital Machine; Intelligence; Energy; Abundance; Not Utopia, But Close Enough; Becoming Technological Supermen; Technological Values; The Meaning Of Life; The Enemy; The Future; and the Patron Saints of Techno-Optimism, a list of 56 people Andreessen believes represents the sources of his Techno-Optimist manifesto.

== Synopsis ==
Andreessen sets out to defend a strong conception of techno-optimism, arguing that technological advancement is the primary driver of human progress and well-being. He addresses common misconceptions and fears about technology, while attempting to refute the idea that technology is harmful to jobs, wages, and societal structures. Andreessen argues that technology is the foundation of human civilization, enabling growth, solving global challenges, and raising living standards. His central thesis is based on the idea that economic growth is essential for a strong society, and technology is the only dependable engine for growth. As population growth slows and limits to natural resource utilization become clear, Andreessen maintains that technological innovation is the key to avoiding stagnation, creating new opportunities, industries, and wealth.

Technological progress as measured through productivity growth, drives economic expansion, wage increases, and improved quality of life. This process, Andreessen writes, allows society to continuously solve problems by developing new tools and methods. Free markets, Andreessen believes, are the best system for fostering technological development. The decentralized nature of the market creates a "discovery machine" that incentivizes innovation and rewards problem-solving. The market-driven pursuit of efficiency, according to Andreessen, lowers costs and expands access to goods and services, resulting in widespread material abundance. This is best exemplified by the knowledge problem, where the complexity of distributed local knowledge optimizes decision making. This is contrasted with the inefficiencies of central economic planning, which Andreessen describes as doomed to fail due to its inability to adapt to complex, real-world dynamics. Andreessen also rejects the idea of social welfare in the form of universal basic income, suggesting instead that technology will create more meaningful work for humans.

Artificial intelligence (AI) is key to the success of this bright future, which Andreessen sees as a pivotal force for expanding human potential. By enhancing productivity and problem-solving capacities, AI is positioned as a universal tool for addressing global challenges. The convergence of intelligence and energy in a positive feedback loop is presented as the path to unprecedented levels of abundance, where human needs can be met with minimal cost. Andreessen frames his manifesto not just as an economic or technological belief system but as a philosophical outlook that sees technological progress as the means to human flourishing, material abundance, and a future of limitless potential. He calls for people to reject techno-pessimism and urges society to embrace technology as the force that will build a better world.

== Influences ==
The manifesto pays homage to the Manifesto of Futurism (1909) by Italian poet Filippo Tommaso Marinetti (1876–1944), who would go on to co-author the Fascist Manifesto a decade later, which was used to describe the political platform of Benito Mussolini. In one part, Andreessen rewords Marinetti's manifesto (Note: "There is no longer beauty except in the struggle. No more masterpieces without an aggressive character. Poetry must be a violent assault against the unknown forces in order to overcome them and prostrate them before men." The Founding and Manifesto of Futurism (1909).) in the context of technology, writing "Beauty exists only in struggle. There is no masterpiece that has not an aggressive character. Technology must be a violent assault on the forces of the unknown, to force them to bow before man." Andreessen ends the manifesto with a list of self-declared patron saints of techno-optimism, with Marinetti taking his place alongside philosopher Friedrich Nietzsche, the fictional character of John Galt, and the neo-reactionary philosopher Nick Land, among others.

== Reception ==
Tobias Lütke, co-founder of Shopify, Brian Armstrong of Coinbase, and investor Steven Sinofsky all praised the manifesto. Statistician Nate Silver says that of the 108 or so statements in the manifesto, he agrees with 84 percent of them, disagreeing with those he found to be exaggerations. Silver also objects to Andreessen's concept of accelerationism when it comes to the existential risk from artificial intelligence.

Historian Adam Tooze criticized the essay as symbolic of unjustified praise for late-stage capitalism and American nationalism, while representing the niche, elite interests of venture capitalists. Tooze places the manifesto in the context of Whig history and philosophical anthropology, illustrated by the use of Andreessen's quotes about human progress by Marian Tupy. Tooze describes the overall tone as an American "faith-based view of history", noting that Andreessen's repeated use of the "We believe" refrain is reminiscent of Christian statements of faith. Political scientist Henry Farrell notes that Andreessen used the words "We believe" 113 times in the manifesto, with Farrell describing it as a "Nicene creed for the cult of progress" based on sources Andreessen refers to as patron saints, one of which is a former Google engineer who started the self-described "meta-religion" of effective accelerationism, which believes in a future techno-capital singularity where technological and economic progress destroys the social and political status quo.

Physicist Mark Buchanan takes a similar position to Silver's, but is far more skeptical. Like Silver, Buchanan is also a techno-optimist, but one who believes a more sensible, practical, and thoughtful position is necessary. Andreessen's manifesto borders on the unreasonable, writes Buchanan, and sounds more like techno-utopianism, not optimism. Buchanan cites Elizabeth Spiers, who called the manifesto "rambling and often contradictory" with "the pathos of the Unabomber manifesto but [lacking] the ideological coherency." Rather than the "wildly oversimplified vision" Andreessen presents, Buchanan points to the ongoing research on technologies related to health and the environment, and new techniques for safer plastic production and recycling. These things are rooted in the ethical use of new technologies, notions like "sustainability" that Andreessen directly attacks in his manifesto and declares to be "enemies". Buchanan disagrees, writing that all technology comes with consequences that we must address, not ignore.

== Notes and references ==
Notes
