= Singularitarianism =

Belief in an incipient technological singularity

Singularitarianism is a movement defined by the belief that a technological singularity—the creation of superintelligence—will likely happen in the medium future, and that deliberate action ought to be taken to ensure that the singularity benefits humans.

Singularitarians are distinguished from other futurists who speculate on a technological singularity by their belief that the singularity is not only possible, but desirable if guided prudently. Accordingly, they may sometimes dedicate their lives to acting in ways they believe will contribute to its rapid yet safe realization.

== Definition ==
The term "Singularitarian" was originally defined by Extropian thinker Mark Plus (Mark Potts) in 1991 to mean "one who believes the concept of a Singularity". This term has since been redefined to mean "Singularity activist" or "friend of the Singularity"; that is, one who acts so as to bring about the singularity.

Singularitarianism can also be thought of as an orientation or an outlook that prefers the enhancement of human intelligence as a specific transhumanist goal instead of focusing on specific technologies such as AI. There are also definitions that identify a singularitarian as an activist or a friend of the concept of singularity, that is, one who acts so as to bring about a singularity. Some sources described it as a moral philosophy that advocates deliberate action to bring about and steer the development of a superintelligence that will lead to a theoretical future point that emerges during a time of accelerated change.

Inventor and futurist Ray Kurzweil, author of the 2005 book The Singularity Is Near: When Humans Transcend Biology, defines a Singularitarian as someone "who understands the Singularity and who has reflected on its implications for his or her own life" and estimates the singularity will occur around 2045.

== History ==
An early singularitarian articulation that history is making progress toward a point of superhuman intelligence is found in Hegel's work The Phenomenology of Spirit. In 1993, mathematician, computer scientist, and science fiction author Vernor Vinge hypothesized that the moment might come when technology will allow "creation of entities with greater than human intelligence" and used the term "the Singularity" to describe this moment. He suggested that the singularity may pose an existential risk for humanity, and that it could happen through one of four means:

1. The development of computers that are "awake" and superhumanly intelligent.
2. Large computer networks (and their associated users) may "wake up" as a superhumanly intelligent entity.
3. Computer/human interfaces may become so intimate that users may reasonably be considered superhumanly intelligent.
4. Biological science may find ways to improve upon the natural human intellect.

Singularitarianism coalesced into a coherent ideology in 2000, when artificial intelligence (AI) researcher Eliezer Yudkowsky wrote The Singularitarian Principles, in which he states that a Singularitarian believes that the singularity is a secular, non-mystical event that is possible, beneficial to the world, and worked toward by its adherents. Yudkowsky's definition is inclusive of various interpretations. Theorists such as Michael Anissimov argue for a strict definition that refers only to the advocacy of the development of superintelligence. In 2000, Yudkowsky co-founded the Singularity Institute for Artificial Intelligence (later renamed the Machine Intelligence Research Institute). He was initially enthusiastic about the prospect of benevolent superintelligence and wanted to accelerate the singularity, but within eight months, he started to worry that high intelligence would not automatically lead to benevolence. He shifted his focus from how to build powerful AI to how to build friendly AI.

Many people believe a technological singularity is possible without adopting Singularitarianism as a moral philosophy. Inventor and futurist Ray Kurzweil, who predicts that the Singularity will occur circa 2045, greatly contributed to popularizing Singularitarianism with his 2005 book The Singularity Is Near: When Humans Transcend Biology.

What, then, is the Singularity? It's a future period during which the pace of technological change will be so rapid, its impact so deep, that human life will be irreversibly transformed. Although neither utopian or dystopian, this epoch will transform the concepts we rely on to give meaning to our lives, from our business models to the cycle of human life, including death itself. Understanding the Singularity will alter our perspective on the significance of our past and the ramifications for our future. To truly understand it inherently changes one's view of life in general and one's particular life. I regard someone who understands the Singularity and who has reflected on its implications for his or her own life as a "singularitarian."

With the support of NASA, Google, and a broad range of technology forecasters and technocapitalists, the Singularity University opened in 2009 at NASA's Ames Research Center in Silicon Valley with the goal of preparing the next generation of leaders to address the challenges of accelerating change.

== Reception ==
There are several objections to Kurzweil's singularitarianism, even from AI optimists. For instance, Douglas Hofstadter has argued that Kurzweil's predicted achievement of human-level AI by 2045 is not viable. Even Gordon Moore, the namesake of Moore's law, which predicates the notion of singularity, has maintained that it will never occur. According to some observers, these criticisms do not diminish enthusiasm for singularity because it mitigates the fear of death, allowing its adherents to enjoy the benefits of religion without its ontological burdens. Science journalist John Horgan wrote in 2008:

Let's face it. The singularity is a religious rather than a scientific vision. The science-fiction writer Ken MacLeod has dubbed it "the rapture for nerds," an allusion to the end-time, when Jesus whisks the faithful to heaven and leaves us sinners behind. Such yearning for transcendence, whether spiritual or technological, is all too understandable. Both as individuals and as a species, we face deadly serious problems, including terrorism, nuclear proliferation, overpopulation, poverty, famine, environmental degradation, climate change, resource depletion, and AIDS. Engineers and scientists should be helping us face the world's problems and find solutions to them, rather than indulging in escapist, pseudoscientific fantasies like the singularity.

Kurzweil rejects this assessment, saying that his predictions about the singularity are driven by the data that increases in computational technology have long been exponential. He says his critics mistakenly take an intuitive, linear view of technological advancement rather than accounting for that exponential growth.

In 2011, Time magazine wrote of Singularitarianism: "even though it sounds like science fiction, it isn't, no more than a weather forecast is science fiction. It's not a fringe idea; it's a serious hypothesis about the future of life on Earth. There's an intellectual gag reflex that kicks in anytime you try to swallow an idea that involves super-intelligent immortal cyborgs, but... while the Singularity appears to be, on the face of it, preposterous, it's an idea that rewards sober, careful evaluation".

== See also ==
- AI mysticism
- Artificial general intelligence
- Eschatology
- Existential risk from artificial general intelligence
- Effective accelerationism
- Global brain
- Intelligence explosion
- Outline of transhumanism
- Post-scarcity economy
- Technological utopianism
- TESCREAL
