= Synthetic dreads =

Synthetic hairstyle mimicking dreadlocks

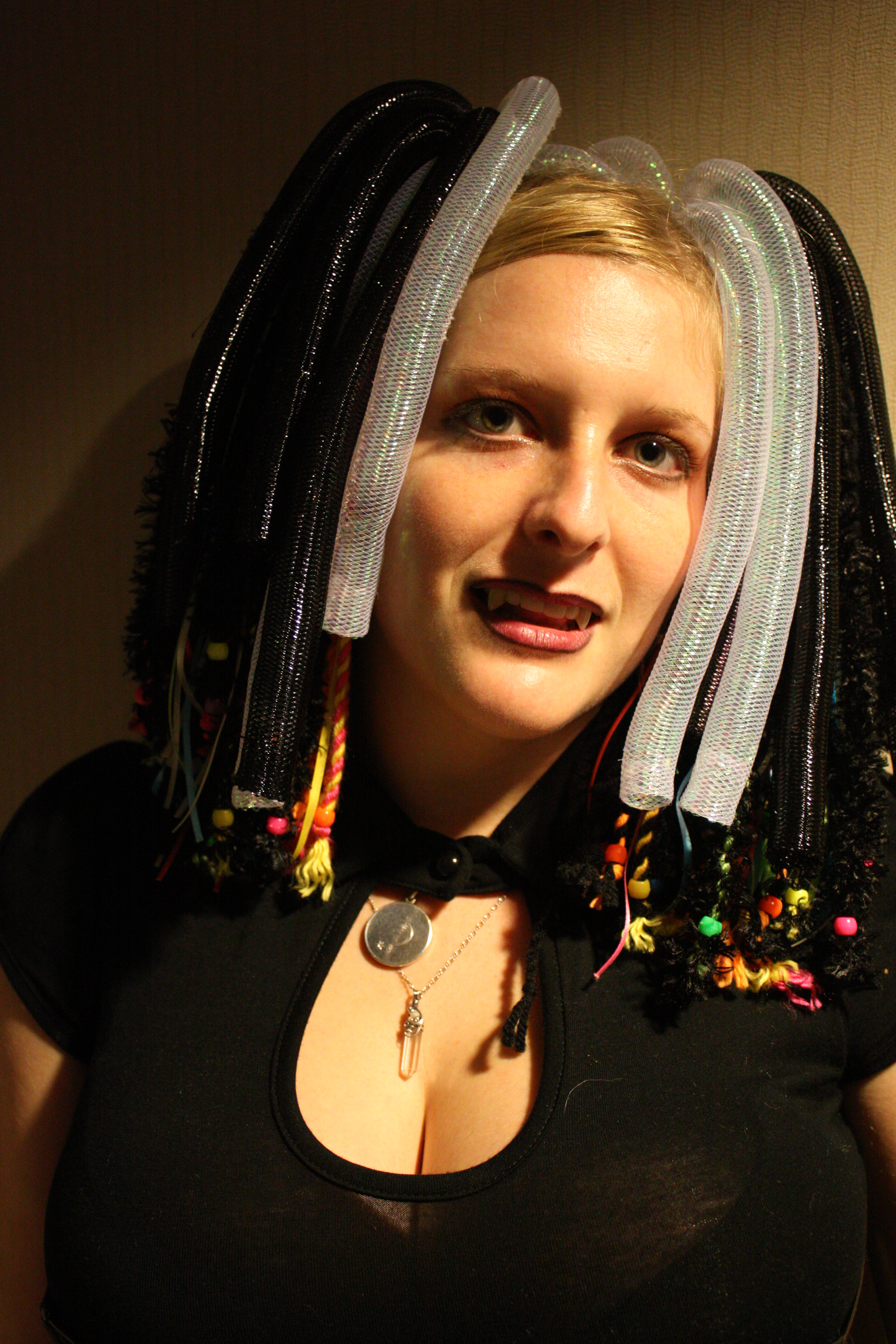
Cyberlocks

Synthetic dreads, also called dread extensions, dread falls, and cyberlocks (also spelled cyberlox), are interlocked coils of synthetic hair, mostly kanekalon, that give the look and feel of natural dreadlocks without the commitment or maintenance. They are mainly worn as a fashion statement for the subculture of cybergoth.

Mixed with both influences from America and the United Kingdom's versions of techno and other electronic music, cybergoths tend to dress in bright colors, neon lights, lots of plastic, loud, or costume jewelry known as "kandi" and one of the most essential items is fake hair. Synthetic dreads or falls are most commonly seen in the cybergoth and cyberpunk fashion and are easily accessorized with LED threads of light, yarn, wool, tubed crin (more commonly known as cyberlocks), beads and more.

== Types of synthetic dreads ==
=== Dread extensions ===
Dread extensions can be braided, sewn, or wrapped into natural hair. With proper maintenance extensions can last up to four months, sometimes longer depending on how fast the hair grows and creates looseness at the scalp. Dread extensions come in single and double ended. Single ended means the synthetic hair is created with the loop on the top so that natural hair can slide through and then be braided or wrapped onto the dread, then tied off with a rubber band or thread.

Double ended is twice the length of a single and folded in half to create the look of "two dreads in one." Only one half of the dread is braided or wrapped into the hair while the other half hangs loose, giving a more realistic appearance because there is no braid at the top on half of the set.

=== Dread falls ===
Dread falls are single ended dreads looped onto a piece of lace or elastic. Falls are attached by pony tail or pigtail and range from short to long, and they are easily customizable. They are worn and removed with no damage or strain on natural hair.

Many other materials can be used in either dreads or extensions such as tubed crin (cyberlocks), beads, yarn, fiber optic string lights, flat plastic in neon colors, etc. Some sets can be made entirely from wool.

Wool dreads give a similar look to real dreads and are very soft. Wool can range in many colors that cannot be recreated in synthetic hair, and therefore they give a certain appeal to cybergoths who tend to coordinate with a variety of colors.

=== Dread styles ===
There are many different styles of dreads. Solid coloured dreads are made from a single coloured fibre. Candycane Dreads are made using two or more colours twisted together to give a candycane effect. Blended dreads are made from a blend of different colours to create a more subtle tone. Transitional Dreads start in one colour and end with the tip being another colour. Natural style dreads are made from the same synthetic materials but resemble natural dreadlocks.

== See also ==
- Dreadlocks
- List of hairstyles
- Braids
- Box braids
- Cornrows
- French braid
- Polish plait
