= Technorealism =

Attempt to expand the middle ground between techno-utopianism and Neo-Luddism

Technorealism is an attempt to expand the middle ground between techno-utopianism and Neo-Luddism by assessing the social and political implications of technologies so that people might all have more control over the shape of their future. An account cited that technorealism emerged in the early 1990s and was introduced by Douglas Rushkoff and Andrew Shapiro. In the Technorealism manifesto, which described the term as a new generation of cultural criticism, it was stated that the goal was not to promote or dismiss technology but to understand it so the application could be aligned with basic human values. Technorealism suggests that a technology, however revolutionary it may seem, remains a continuation of similar revolutions throughout human history.

== Approach ==
The technorealist approach involves a continuous critical examination of how technologies might help or hinder people in the struggle to improve the quality of their lives, their communities, and their economic, social, and political structures. In addition, instead of policy wonks, experts, and the elite, it is the technology critic who assumes the center stage in the discourse of technology policy issues.

Although technorealism began with a focus on U.S.-based concerns about information technology, it has evolved into an international intellectual movement with a variety of interests such as biotechnology and nanotechnology.

== Technorealism in political science and IR ==
Isti Marta Sukma has proposed a distinct interpretation of techno-realism within the tradition of political realism. In this formulation, technology is treated as a central means of power in contemporary politics, alongside the roles of identity formation and non-state actors in shaping political dynamics.

== See also ==
- techno-realism in political science
- Technocriticism
- History of science and technology
- Pantheon – a TV series that follows techno-realism

=== Ethics ===
- Bioethics
- Infoethics
- Neuroethics
- Nanoethics
- Roboethics
- Technoethics
