= Technological utopianism =

Any ideology based on the premise that advances in technology could bring a utopia

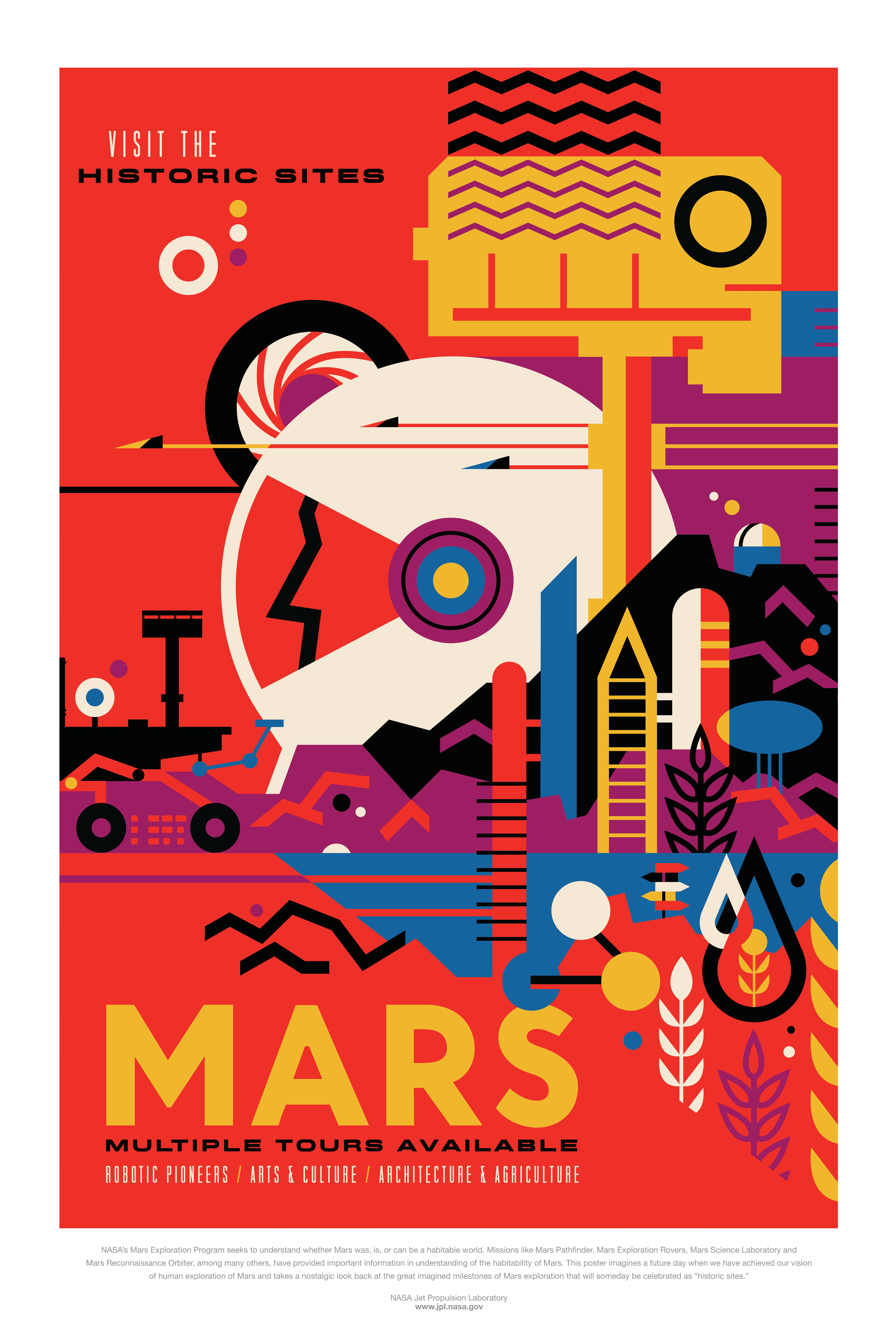
A NASA poster about a fictional Mars tour. Technological advances in space travel is often a theme in utopias.

Technological utopianism, often called techno-utopianism or technoutopianism, is any ideology based on the premise that advances in science and technology could and should bring about a utopia, or at least help to fulfill one or another utopian ideal. A techno-utopia is therefore an ideal society, in which laws, government, and social conditions are solely operating for the benefit and well-being of all its citizens, set in the near- or far-future, as advanced science and technology will allow these ideal living standards to exist; for example, post-scarcity, transformations in human nature, the avoidance or prevention of suffering and even the end of death. Technological utopianism is often connected with other discourses presenting technologies as agents of social and cultural change, such as technological determinism or media imaginaries.

A tech-utopia does not disregard any problems that technology may cause, but strongly believes that technology allows mankind to make social, economic, political, and cultural advancements. Overall, Technological Utopianism views technology's impacts as extremely positive. In the late 20th and early 21st centuries, several ideologies and movements, such as the cyberdelic counterculture, the Californian Ideology, cyber-utopianism, transhumanism, and singularitarianism, have emerged promoting a form of techno-utopia as a reachable goal. The movement known as effective accelerationism (e/acc) even advocates for "progress at all costs".

== History ==
=== From the 19th to mid-20th centuries ===
Karl Marx believed that science and democracy were the right and left hands of what he called the move from the realm of necessity to the realm of freedom. He argued that advances in science helped delegitimize the rule of kings and the power of the Christian Church. 19th-century liberals, socialists, and republicans often embraced techno-utopianism. Radicals like Joseph Priestley pursued scientific investigation while advocating democracy. Robert Owen, Charles Fourier and Henri de Saint-Simon in the early 19th century inspired communalists with their visions of a future scientific and technological evolution of humanity using reason. Radicals seized on Darwinian evolution to validate the idea of social progress. Edward Bellamy's socialist utopia in Looking Backward, which inspired hundreds of socialist clubs in the late 19th century United States and a national political party, was as highly technological as Bellamy's imagination. For Bellamy and the Fabian Socialists, socialism was to be brought about as a painless corollary of industrial development.

Marx and Friedrich Engels saw more pain and conflict involved, but agreed about the inevitable end. Marxists argued that the advance of technology laid the groundwork not only for the creation of a new society, with different property relations, but also for the emergence of new human beings reconnected to nature and themselves. At the top of the agenda for empowered proletarians was "to increase the total productive forces as rapidly as possible". The 19th and early 20th century Left, from social democrats to communists, were focused on industrialization, economic development and the promotion of reason, science, and the idea of progress.

According to historian Asif Siddiqi, technological utopianism was a "millenarian mantra" in the Soviet Union from its inception. The Bolsheviks imagined "a world of magnificent factories and mechanized agriculture that produced all of society's necessities," a new socialist machine age. Siddiqi writes that "this obsession with the power of science and technology to remake society was partly rooted in crude Marxism, but much of it derived from the Bolsheviks' own vision to remake Russia into a modern state, one which would compare and compete with the leading capitalist nations in forging a new path to the future." From the 1930s onwards, Soviet technological utopianism embraced a populist view of technological achievements, which Siddiqi summarizes as "technology for the masses." Soviet science fiction was heavily focused on future technology, and often depicted a convergence between technological utopia and socialist utopia.

Sovietologist Paul Josephson argued that most strains of Soviet technological utopianism emphasized technology was apolitical, "serving the profit motive and the industrialist under capitalism, but benefiting all humanity under socialism." To avoid technological dependence on capitalist states, the Soviet Union and other socialist governments influenced by its narratives sought to create domestic technological innovations, supported by autarkic engineering communities and supply chains.

Some technological utopians promoted eugenics. Holding that in studies of families, such as the Jukes and Kallikaks, science had proven that many traits such as criminality and alcoholism were hereditary, many advocated the sterilization of those displaying negative traits. Forcible sterilization programs were implemented in several states in the United States. H. G. Wells in works such as The Shape of Things to Come promoted technological utopianism. To many philosophers, the horrors of World War II and the Holocaust, as Theodor Adorno underlined, seemed to shatter the ideal of Condorcet and other thinkers of the Enlightenment, which commonly equated scientific progress with social progress.

=== From late 20th and early 21st centuries ===
The Goliath of totalitarianism will be brought down by the David of the microchip.

— Ronald Reagan, 14 June 1989

A movement of techno-utopianism began to flourish again in the dot-com culture of the 1990s, particularly in the West Coast of the United States, especially based around Silicon Valley. The Californian Ideology was a set of beliefs combining bohemian and anti-authoritarian attitudes from the counterculture of the 1960s with techno-utopianism and support for libertarian economic policies. It was reflected in, reported on, and even actively promoted in the pages of Wired magazine, which was founded in San Francisco in 1993 and served for a number years as the "bible" of its adherents.

This form of techno-utopianism reflected a belief that technological change revolutionizes human affairs, and that digital technology in particular – of which the Internet was but a modest harbinger – would increase personal freedom by freeing the individual from the rigid embrace of bureaucratic big government. "Self-empowered knowledge workers" would render traditional hierarchies redundant; digital communications would allow them to escape the modern city, an "obsolete remnant of the industrial age".

Similar forms of "digital utopianism" has often entered in the political messages of party and social movements that point to the Web or more broadly to new media as harbingers of political and social change. Its adherents claim it transcended conventional "right/left" distinctions in politics by rendering politics obsolete. However, Western techno-utopianism disproportionately attracted adherents from the libertarian right end of the political spectrum. Western techno-utopians often have a hostility toward government regulation and a belief in the superiority of the free market system. Prominent "oracles" of techno-utopianism included George Gilder and Kevin Kelly, an editor of Wired who also published several books.

During the late 1990s dot-com boom, when the speculative bubble gave rise to claims that an era of "permanent prosperity" had arrived, techno-utopianism flourished, typically among the small percentage of the population who were employees of Internet startups and/or owned large quantities of high-tech stocks. With the subsequent crash, many of these dot-com techno-utopians had to rein in some of their beliefs in the face of the clear return of traditional economic reality. According to The Economist, Wikipedia "has its roots in the techno-optimism that characterised the internet at the end of the 20th century. It held that ordinary people could use their computers as tools for liberation, education, and enlightenment."

In the late 1990s and especially during the first decade of the 21st century, technorealism and techno-progressivism are stances that have risen among advocates of technological change as critical alternatives to techno-utopianism. However, technological utopianism persists in the 21st century as a result of new technological developments and their impact on society. For example, several technical journalists and social commentators, such as Mark Pesce, have interpreted the WikiLeaks phenomenon and the United States diplomatic cables leak in early December 2010 as a precursor to, or an incentive for, the creation of a techno-utopian transparent society. Cyber-utopianism, first coined by Evgeny Morozov, is another manifestation of this, in particular in relation to the Internet and social networking.

Nick Bostrom contends that the rise of machine superintelligence carries both existential risks and an extreme potential to improve the future, which might be realized quickly in the event of an intelligence explosion. In Deep Utopia: Life and Meaning in a Solved World, he further explored ideal scenarios where human civilization reaches technological maturity and solves its diverse coordination problems. He listed some technologies that are theoretically achievable, such as cognitive enhancement, reversal of aging, self-replicating spacecrafts, arbitrary sensory inputs (taste, sound...), or the precise control of motivation, mood, well-being and personality.

In North Korea, technological utopianism remains one of the key themes of the state's Juche ideology. The pursuit of advanced strategic technologies is promoted as an integral part of autarkic economic development. North Korean technological utopianism essentially rests on three narratives: the rejection of consumer society and culture, an emphasis on heavy industry, and a belief in the ability of the masses of workers to make great technological achievements under the Workers' Party of Korea. In practice, this has resulted in most of North Korea's technological resources being utilized for large scale, resource intensive, infrastructure and military projects, many of which have primarily symbolic importance. Domestic innovations in nuclear and space sciences continue to play a major role in the state's propaganda narratives, which seek to portray North Korea as a modern regional power.

== Principles ==
Bernard Gendron, a professor of philosophy at the University of Wisconsin–Milwaukee, defines the four principles of modern technological utopians in the late 20th and early 21st centuries as follows:

1. We are presently undergoing a (post-industrial) revolution in technology;
2. In the post-industrial age, technological growth will be sustained (at least);
3. In the post-industrial age, technological growth will lead to the end of economic scarcity;
4. The elimination of economic scarcity will lead to the elimination of every major social evil.

Rushkoff presents us with multiple claims that surround the basic principles of Technological Utopianism:

1. Technology reflects and encourages the best aspects of human nature, fostering "communication, collaboration, sharing, helpfulness, and community".
2. Technology improves our interpersonal communication, relationships, and communities. Early Internet users shared their knowledge of the Internet with others around them.
3. Technology democratizes society. The expansion of access to knowledge and skills led to the connection of people and information. The broadening of freedom of expression created "the online world...in which we are allowed to voice our own opinions". The reduction of the inequalities of power and wealth meant that everyone has an equal status on the internet and is allowed to do as much as the next person.
4. Technology inevitably progresses. The interactivity that came from the inventions of the TV remote control, video game joystick, computer mouse and computer keyboard allowed for much more progress.
5. Unforeseen impacts of technology are positive. As more people discovered the Internet, they took advantage of being linked to millions of people, and turned the Internet into a social revolution. The government released it to the public, and its "social side effect… [became] its main feature".
6. Technology increases efficiency and consumer choice. The creation of the TV remote, video game joystick, and computer mouse liberated these technologies and allowed users to manipulate and control them, giving them many more choices.
7. New technology can solve the problems created by old technology. Social networks and blogs were created out of the collapse of dot.com bubble businesses' attempts to run pyramid schemes on users.

== Criticisms ==
Critics claim that techno-utopianism's identification of social progress with scientific progress is a form of positivism and scientism. Critics of modern libertarian techno-utopianism point out that it tends to focus on "government interference" while dismissing the positive effects of the regulation of business. They also point out that it has little to say about the environmental impact of technology and that its ideas have little relevance for much of the rest of the world that are still relatively quite poor (see global digital divide). In his 2010 study System Failure: Oil, Futurity, and the Anticipation of Disaster, Canada Research Chairholder in cultural studies Imre Szeman argues that technological utopianism is one of the social narratives that prevent people from acting on the knowledge they have concerning the effects of oil on the environment.

Another concern is the amount of reliance society may place on their technologies in these techno-utopia settings. For example, In a controversial 2011 article "Techno-Utopians are Mugged by Reality", L. Gordon Crovitz of The Wall Street Journal explored the concept of the violation of free speech by shutting down social media to stop violence. As a result of a wave of British cities being looted, former British Prime Minister David Cameron argued that the government should have the ability to shut down social media during crime sprees so that the situation could be contained. A poll was conducted to see if Twitter users would prefer to let the service be closed temporarily or keep it open so they could chat about the famous television show The X-Factor. The end report showed that every respondent opted for The X-Factor discussion. Clovitz contends that the negative social effect of technological utopia is that society is so addicted to technology that humanity simply cannot be parted from it even for the greater good. While many techno-utopians would like to believe that digital technology is for the greater good, he says it can also be used negatively to bring harm to the public. These two criticisms are sometimes referred to as a technological anti-utopian view or a techno-dystopia.

According to Ronald Adler and Russell Proctor, mediated communication such as phone calls, instant messaging and text messaging are steps towards a utopian world in which one can easily contact another regardless of time or location. However, mediated communication removes many aspects that are helpful in transferring messages. As it stands as of 2022, most text, email, and instant messages offer fewer nonverbal cues about the speaker's feelings than do face-to-face encounters. This makes it so that mediated communication can easily be misconstrued and the intended message is not properly conveyed. With the absence of tone, body language, and environmental context, the chance of a misunderstanding is much higher, rendering the communication ineffective. In fact, mediated technology can be seen from a dystopian view because it can be detrimental to effective interpersonal communication. These criticisms would only apply to messages that are prone to misinterpretation as not every text based communication requires contextual cues. The limitations of lacking tone and body language in text-based communication could potentially be mitigated by video and augmented reality versions of digital communication technologies.

In 2019, philosopher Nick Bostrom introduced the notion of a vulnerable world, "one in which there is some level of technological development at which civilization almost certainly gets devastated by default", citing the risks of a pandemic caused by a DIY biohacker, or an arms race triggered by the development of novel armaments. He writes that "Technology policy should not unquestioningly assume that all technological progress is beneficial, or that complete scientific openness is always best, or that the world has the capacity to manage any potential downside of a technology after it is invented."

== See also ==
- Accelerationism
- Creative disruption
- Crypto-anarchism
- Eschatology
- Extropianism
- Fully Automated Luxury Communism
- High modernism
- Historicism
- Immanentize the eschaton
- Luddite
- Millennialism
- Nanosocialism
- Neo-Luddism
- Post-aging society
- Post scarcity
- Post-work society
- Singularitarianism
- Star Trek
- Techno-progressivism
- Technocentrism
- Technogaianism
- Technocracy
- Technological dystopia
- Technological singularity
- Technological supremacy
- Technophilia
- Technorealism
- Towards a New Socialism
- Transhumanism
- Yellow socialism
- Jacque Fresco
- Effective accelerationism
