= Alexander Bolonkin =

Russian-American scientist (1933–2020)

Alexander Alexandrovich Bolonkin
- Александр Александрович Болонкин
- Born: 14 March 1933; Perm, Soviet Union
- Died: 25 December 2020 (aged 87)
- Citizenship: Soviet Union (1933–1987); United States (1987–2020)
- Education: Perm Aviation College, Kazan Aviation Institute, Kiev State University, Moscow Aviation Institute, Leningrad Polytechnic University
- Known for: human rights activism with participation in dissident movement in the Soviet Union
- Scientific career
- Fields: cybernetician
- Workplaces: Moscow Aviation Technology Institute; Bauman Moscow State Technical University; New Jersey Institute of Technology; NASA; National Research Council

Alexander Alexandrovich Bolonkin (Russian: Александр Александрович Болонкин; 14 March 1933 – 25 December 2020) was a Russian-American scientist and academic who worked in the Soviet aviation, space and rocket industries and lectured in Moscow universities, before being arrested in 1972 by the KGB as a dissident. He served terms of imprisonment and exile for 15 years until 1987, when he emigrated to the US as a political refugee.

After that he lectured at American universities and worked as a researcher at NASA, U.S. Air Force, and for the National Research Council. He was a member of the board of directors of the International Space Agency; chairman of the Space Flights section; member of the advisory board of the Lifeboat Foundation and its Space Settlement Board; the founding president of the International Association of Former Soviet Political Prisoners and Victims of the Communist Regime (IASPPV); and co-founder and co-chair of the board of directors of American Russian-speaking Association for Civil & Human Rights (ARA).

== Life and career ==
Bolonkin was born in Perm. He got a higher secondary education in aviation engineering from Perm Aviation College, receiving its diploma in 1952. His higher education resulted in a master's degree in aviation engineering from Kazan Aviation Institute in 1958, a master's degree in mathematics from Kiev University in 1963, a doctorate in aerospace engineering from the Moscow Aviation Institute in 1964, and a habilitated doctor degree in cybernetics and mathematics from Leningrad Polytechnic University in 1971.

He worked at the Antonov aviation design company as a senior engineer and head of the aerodynamics group, participating in the design of aircraft from the An-8 to the An-124, and at the Glushko rocketry company, participating in the design of rocket engines, and lectured at the Moscow Aviation Institute, the Moscow Aviation Technology Institute, and the Bauman Moscow State Technical University.

== Arrest and Trial ==
In 1972 he was arrested by the KGB for dissemination of an underground dissident newsletter, listening to the Voice of America and reading and disseminating works by Andrei Sakharov and Aleksandr Solzhenitsyn. Bolonkin was sentenced to 4 years in a labour camp and 2 years in exile in Buryatia., Shortly before his sentence of exile ended Bolonkin was given a sentence of 2 years in a labour camp on a charge of stealing state property. For 15 years he was tortured, imprisoned, and exiled in Mordovia and Siberia. In 1981 Sakharov appealed for international support to have him freed. In April 1982 he made a televised recantation that Amnesty International ascribed to threats of beatings and rape.

In 1987, during the early perestroika, he was released and gained entry to the United States as a political refugee. In the United States he has lectured at New Jersey Institute of Technology and worked at NASA as a senior researcher and in the scientific laboratories of the US Air Force as a senior research fellow of the National Research Council. He subsequently worked in Israel as chief scientist at the Strategic Solutions Technology Group.

On November 21, 1990, he was acquitted of the conviction of November 23, 1973, and on March 22, 1991 — of the conviction of February 8, 1982, in both cases “for lack of corpus delicti.”

== Research ==
By 2009, Bolonkin held 17 patents. Among his innovations in space exploration are a cable space launcher, a hypersonic tube launcher, a kinetic anti-gravitation system, a multi-reflex propulsion device, space towers, an electrostatic solar sail, an electric ramjet space propulsion device, and the cable aviation device. In an Izvestia interview in 1998, he predicted the achievement of cybernetic immortality by 2020, and in 2011 he was consulted as an expert by the 2045 Initiative. He also developed the idea of domed cities as a protection against fallout, and in physics researched the production of what he called "AB-Matter" through femtotechnology.

== Board memberships and foundations ==
Bolonkin was a member of the board of directors of the International Space Agency and chairman of the space flights section.

He is also a member of the advisory board of the Lifeboat Foundation and its space settlement board, and the founding president of the International Association of Former Soviet Political Prisoners and Victims of the Communist Regime (IASPPV) and co-founder and co-chair of American Russian-speaking Association for Civil & Human Rights, an organization for the civil and human rights of Russian-Americans. In this role, he co-authored with Dmitri Glinski a testimony for the hearings on the Magnitsky Act held by the U.S. House of Representatives' Tom Lantos Human Rights Committee before the passage of the Act in November 2012.

== Bibliography ==
- Bolonkin, Alexander (2005). Non Rocket Space Launch and Flight. Elsevier. ISBN 978-0-08044-731-5.
- Bolonkin, Alexander (2006). New Concepts, Ideas and Innovations in Aerospace, Technology and Human Sciences. NOVA. ISBN 978-1-60021-787-6.
- Bolonkin, Alexander (2011). Femtotechnologies and Revolutionary Projects. LAMBERT. ISBN 978-3-8473-2229-0.
- Bolonkin, Alexander (2011). Life and Science. LAMBERT. ISBN 978-3-8473-0839-3.
- Bolonkin, Alexander (2010). Universe, Human Immortality and Future Human Evaluation. Elsevier. ISBN 978-0124158016.
- Bolonkin, Alexander and Richard Cathcart (2007). Macro-Projects: Environments and Technologies. NOVA. ISBN 978-1-60456-998-8.
- Bolonkin, Alexander (2010). Memories of Soviet Political Prisoner. Publish America. ISBN 978-1-4489-4414-9.
- Bolonkin, Alexander (2014). Innovations and New Technologies (v2). LULU. ISBN 978-1-312-62280-7.
