= Digital immortality =

Hypothetical concept of storing a personality in digital form

Digital immortality (or "virtual immortality") is the hypothetical concept of storing (or cloning) a person's mind, or at least their personality, in digital substrate, i.e., a computer, robot or cyberspace (mind uploading). The result might look like an avatar behaving, reacting, and thinking like a person on the basis of that person's digital archive. After the death of the individual, this avatar could remain static or continue to learn and self-improve autonomously (possibly becoming seed AI).

A considerable portion of transhumanists and singularitarians place great hope into the belief that they may eventually become immortal by creating one or many non-biological functional copies of their brains, thereby leaving their "biological shell". These copies may then "live eternally" in a version of digital "heaven" or paradise.

== Realism ==
The National Science Foundation has awarded a half-million-dollar grant to the universities of Central Florida at Orlando and Illinois at Chicago to explore how researchers might use artificial intelligence, archiving, and computer imaging to create convincing, digital versions of real people, a possible first step toward virtual immortality.

The Digital Immortality Institute explores three factors necessary for digital immortality. First, at whatever level of implementation, avatars require guaranteed Internet accessibility. Next, avatars must be what users specify, and they must remain so. Finally, future representations must be secured before the living users are no more.

The aim of Dmitry Itskov's 2045 Initiative is to "create technologies enabling the clone of an individual's personality to a non-biological carrier, and extending existence, including to the point of immortality".

== Method ==
Reaching digital immortality is a two-step process:

1. archiving and digitizing people,
2. making the avatar live

Digital immortality has been argued to go beyond technical processes of digitization of people, and encompass social aspects as well. For example, Joshua Hurtado has presented a four-step framework in which the digital immortalization of people could preserve the social bond between the living and the dead. These steps are: 1) data gathering, 2) data codification, 3) data activation, and 4) data embodiment. Each of these steps is linked to a form of preserving the social bond, either through talk, embodied emotionality (expressing emotions through one's form of embodiment) or monumentalism (creating a monument, in this case in digital form, to remember the dead).

=== Archiving and digitizing people ===
According to Gordon Bell and Jim Gray from Microsoft Research, retaining every conversation that a person has ever heard is already realistic: it needs less than a terabyte of storage (for adequate quality). The speech or text recognition technologies are one of the biggest challenges of the concept.

A second possibility would be to archive and analyze social Internet use to map the personality of people. By analyzing social Internet use during 50 years, it would be possible to model a society's culture, a society's way of thinking, and a society's interests.

Martine Rothblatt envisions the creation of "mindfiles" – collections of data from all kinds of sources, including the photos people upload to Facebook, the discussions and opinions they share on forums or blogs, and other social media interactions that reflect their life experiences and unique self.

Some find that photos, videos, soundclips, social media posts and other data of oneself could already be regarded as such an archiving.

Susanne Asche states:

As a hopefully minimalistic definition then, digital immortality can be roughly considered as involving a person-centric repository containing a copy of everything that a person sees, hears, says, or engenders over his or her lifespan, including photographs, videos, audio recordings, movies, television shows, music albums/CDs, newspapers, documents, diaries and journals, interviews, meetings, love letters, notes, papers, art pieces, and so on, and so on; and if not everything, then at least as much as the person has and takes the time and trouble to include. The person's personality, emotion profiles, thoughts, beliefs, and appearance are also captured and integrated into an artificially intelligent, interactive, con-versational agent/avatar. This avatar is placed in charge of (and perhaps "equated" with) the collected material in the repository so that the agent can present the illusion of having the factual memories, thoughts, and beliefs of the person him/herself.

— Susanne Asche, Kulturelles Gedächtnis im 21. Jahrhundert: Tagungsband des internationalen Symposiums, Digital Immortality & Runaway Technology

=== Mindclone generation ===
Rothblatt proposes the term "mindware" for software that is being developed with the goal of generating conscious AIs. Such software would read a person's "mindfile" to generate a "mindclone". Rothblatt also proposes a certain level of governmental approval for mindware, like an FDA certification, to ensure that the resulting mindclones are well made.

=== Calibration process ===
During the calibration process, the biological people are living at the same time as their artifact in silicon. The artifact in silicon is calibrated to be as close as possible to the person in question. During this process ongoing updates, synchronization, and interaction between the two minds would maintain the twin minds as one.

== Ethics ==
According to Boston University's Magazine, the advancement of Artificial Intelligence (AI) is ushering humanity into a realm where the boundary between the living and the deceased is becoming increasingly blurred. James Trew's article talks about generative technology like ChatGPT and Midjourney. James Trew's article, Digital 'immortality' is coming and we're not ready for it, provides information about the misfortune of sorting through the possessions of a dead relative and using it for other circumstances.

However, with these advancements come a myriad of ethical and legal dilemmas, particularly concerning digital remains and postmortem privacy.

=== Mourning and digital remains ===
Martine Rothblatt wrote a book about the ethics in digital immortality and made a point about how one of the central questions raised by digital immortality is the nature of identity and authenticity in a digital form. Rothblatt delves into the concept of continuity of consciousness and whether a digital replica of a person can truly capture their essence or if it is merely a simulation.

Like Melody Parker says in their article, to communicate with someone on the other side of the veil, you don't need a Ouija board or séance. Artificial intelligence may transform the way we grieve as like the author some view it as a source of solace, others argue it may hinder the natural progression of grief like Rothblatt.

=== Postmortem privacy and digital immortality ===
As AI-enabled replicas interact with the world, concerns emerge about the privacy and autonomy of the deceased. According to Vinícius Ferreira Galvão, their article, "Discussing human values in digital immortality: towards a value-oriented perspective", they had stated questions to how ethical issues are regarded after the death of an individual. Questions like "Who owns the data related to the deceased if he/she has not delegated an heir? If a perfect digital copy of the deceased is possible, should it be treated similarly as any human being?" arise.

According to Fiorenza Gamba, "Holograms, digital twins and chatbots are increasingly used to reproduce the likenesses, behaviours and emotions of the deceased. Moreover, such technologies enable these replicas to interact with the survivors." She also notes that digital immoratility can pose privacy concerns.

=== Legal implications ===
According to Bell and Gray's article "Digital Immortality", digital immortality manifests in various forms, from one-way immortality where data is preserved for future generations to two-way immortality where individuals can communicate with artificial versions of the deceased.

== In fiction ==
Digital immortality is common in the cyberpunk subgenre of science fiction.

== See also ==
- Artificial intelligence
- AI effect
- Mind uploading
- Artificial general intelligence
- Blue Brain Project – Swiss brain research initiative
- Ship of Theseus
- Technological resurrection
- Uploaded astronaut
