= Vladimir Burakov =

Russian politician (1954–2024)

- Владимир Бураков
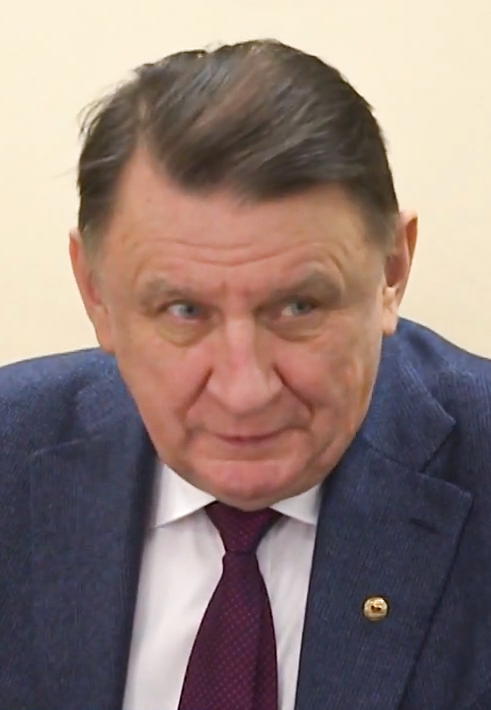
- Burakov in 2021

5th Chairman of the Russian Party of Pensioners for Social Justice
- In office 26 July 2016 – 23 December 2024
- Preceded by: Yevgeny Artyukh
- Succeeded by: Erik Prazdnikov

Personal details
- Born: Vladimir Yuryevich Burakov; 6 November 1954 Kharkov, Ukrainian SSR, USSR
- Died: 23 December 2024 (aged 70)
- Party: Russian Party of Pensioners for Social Justice
- Other political affiliations: Fatherland; A Just Russia
- Children: 2
- Education: Moscow Institute of Aviation Technology (1977); Moscow Higher Party School (1989)

Vladimir Yuryevich Burakov (Russian: Владимир Юрьевич Бураков; 6 November 1954 – 23 December 2024) was a Russian politician who served as chairman of the Party of Pensioners for Social Justice from 26 July 2016 until his death in December 2024.

Born on 6 November 1954, in Kharkov, Burakov graduated from the Moscow Institute of Aviation Technology in 1977 and the Moscow Higher Party School in 1989. He worked at several agencies such as the Chamber of Commerce and Industry of the Russian Federation before becoming leader of the Party of Pensioners for Social Justice in 2016 after the dismissal of his predecessor, Evgeniy Petrovich Artyukh.

Burakov was a widower and has two daughters. He died in December 2024, at the age of 70.
