= George M. Martin =

American biogerontologist (1927–2022)

- Born: June 30, 1927; New York, New York, United States
- Died: December 17, 2022 (aged 95); Seattle, Washington, United States
- Education: University of Washington (BS, 1949); University of Washington School of Medicine (MD, 1952)
- Scientific career
- Fields: Gerontology
- Workplaces: University of Washington

George M. Martin (June 30, 1927 – December 17, 2022) was an American biogerontologist. He was a faculty member at the University of Washington from 1957 until the end of his career. Martin was a professor emeritus in the Department of Pathology, adjunct professor of genome sciences, and director emeritus of the University of Washington's Alzheimer's Disease Research Center.

Martin is best known as one of the founders of modern biogerontology.

== Biography ==
Martin was born in New York City, the son of a police officer. Martin attended less than a year at the Cooper Union School of Engineering, and one year at the College of the City of New York before serving in the US Navy from 1945 to 1946. He moved to Alaska at age 19, and held various jobs including playing trumpet in a jazz band and working for a railroad company. After two years at the University of Alaska Fairbanks, Martin completed his undergraduate degree in chemistry at the University of Washington in 1949 before completing his medical doctorate from the same institution in 1952. He subsequently completed his internship at the Montreal General Hospital, followed by a residency in anatomic pathology at the University of Chicago. In 1957, Martin accepted a faculty position at the University of Washington in the Department of Pathology, where he founded the Clinical Cytogenetics Laboratory. Martin became the founding director of the University of Washington Medical Scientist Training Program in 1970.

Martin served as the Scientific Director of the American Federation for Aging Research and as president of the Tissue Culture Association and the Gerontological Society of America. He served as a scientific editor and served on editorial boards of many scholarly journals, including Science, Age and Ageing, Mechanisms of Ageing and Development, Aging Cell, Ageing Research Reviews, Geriatrics and Gerontology International and Alzheimer's Disease Review. Martin was also the chairman of the scientific advisory board for The Ellison Biomedical Foundation.

== Career ==
Martin's early work focused on the neurobiology of Wilson's disease and the function of caeruloplasmin, the underlying gene responsible for this disorder. This work served as a catalyst for Martin to learn about genetics, as supported by Arno Motulsky, founder of the University of Washington department of Medical Genetics. Martin also contributed to early work surrounding the techniques and use of human cell culture, including describing donor covariates that contributed to replicative limits in culture.

Martin's major research focus involved using genetic approaches to elucidate the pathobiology of aging and age-related diseases. Martin's work provided important insights into multiple topics in the field of geroscience. His group conducted genetic linking studies identifying loci associated with familial forms of Alzheimer's disease, a discovery that led to the recognition of amyloid beta (Aβ) in the pathology of that disorder. Martin's group separately identified the genetic defect causing the aging disease Werner syndrome, and its underlying contributory mechanisms to the disorder. His studies provided the first evidence that epithelial cells from arteries, especially from parts that develop severe atherosclerosis, have limited potential to divide. He and colleagues demonstrated that senescent cells cannot be returned to a replicative state when their cytoplasm is combined with cytoplasm from normal, young cells. Martin's laboratory was the first to demonstrate the accumulation of somatic mutations in human epithelial cells during the aging process. His later research used genetic engineering in mice to elucidate mechanisms of aging and Alzheimer's disease.

Martin was not as well known as a futurist, but some of Martin's ideas predate predictions of better known futurists such as Ray Kurzweil and Vernor Vinge, and are similar to those eventually championed in the field. In 1971, for example, Martin described a process for achieving a condition equatable to immortality using a scientific process now termed mind uploading:

The ultimate solution [for immortality] is pure science fiction. In fact, the rationale for implementing the interim solution is largely based upon two articles of faith. The first is the perfectly reasonable proposition that science will continue to grow – if not at its present exponential rate, at least linearly. The second, requiring a good deal more optimism, is the belief that Homo sapiens, during this critical phase of his natural history, will not destroy himself and his planet. We shall assume that developments in neurobiology, bioengineering and related disciplines… will ultimately provide suitable techniques of 'read-out' of the stored information from cryobiologically preserved brains into nth generation computers capable of vastly outdoing the dynamic patterning of operation of our cerebral neurones. We would then join a family of humanoid 'post-somatic' bio-electrical hybrids capable of contributing to cultural evolution at rates far exceeding anything now imaginable.

== Honors ==
- Sigma Xi
- Eleanor Roosevelt International Cancer Research Fellow, 1968-1969
- Josiah Macy Jr. Foundation Faculty Scholar Award, 1978-1979
- Alpha Omega Alpha, 1980
- Gerontological Society of America Brookdale award, 1980
- Fellow of the American Association for the Advancement of Science, 1982
- University of Washington School of Medicine Outstanding Alumnus Award, 1987
- National Institutes of Health Merit Award, 1989
- Allied Signal Achievement Award in Aging, 1990
- National Academy of Medicine, 1992
- American Aging Association Research Medal, 1992
- Gerontological Society of America Donald B. Kent award, 1993
- American Federation for Aging Research Irving S. Wright award, 1996
- Paul Harris Fellow, Rotary International, 1998
- Paul Glenn Foundation Award, 1998
- Distinguished Scientist Award, University of Urbino Faculty of Sciences, 1998
- World Alzheimer Congress Lifetime Achievement Award, 2000
- Fondation IPSEN Longevity prize, 2002
- American Aging Association Distinguished Scientist Award, 2004
- Shober Prize, Martin-Luther University Halle-Wittenberg, 2005
- Trustee Emeritus, Buck Institute for Age Research, 2006
- Honorary Alumnus (NIMH-sponsored Summer Research Institute in Geriatric Psychiatry), 2008
- Dart/New York University Biotechnology Achievement Award, 2011
- SENECA Medal for Research into Aging, Industrial Club of Düsseldorf, Düsseldorf, Germany, 2011
- Inaugural Science Award of the Buck Institute for Research in Aging, 2011
