= Philippe van Nedervelde =

Belgian futurist and transhumanist

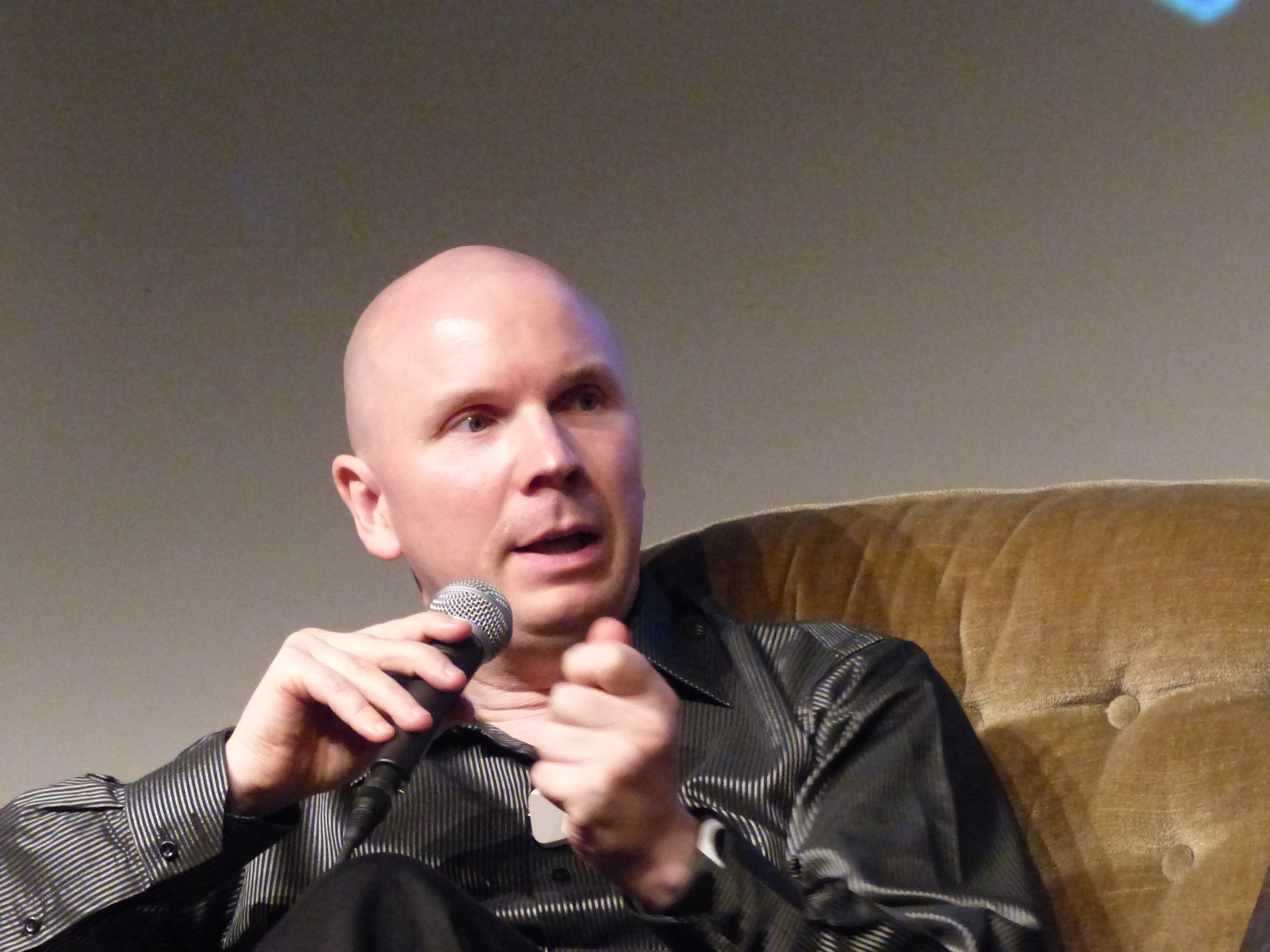
- Philippe van Nedervelde at Het Denkgelag
- Education: Katholieke Universiteit Leuven

Philippe van Nedervelde (born 1967) is a Belgian virtual reality specialist, public speaker and media communicator with various futurist organizations, and a public advocate of technology and science.

== Early life and education ==
Van Nedervelde was born in Belgium and is of Belgian-French nationality. He completed a Bachelor of Arts in social sciences, a Master of Arts in communication studies, and a postgraduate in interactive media and information science from Katholieke Universiteit Leuven. He holds a Cambridge University Certificate of Proficiency in English, and is also fluent in Spanish, German, French, and Dutch.

== Futurist career ==
Van Nedervelde is a futurist and transhumanist writer, activist, and speaker. He advocates for space settlements to avoid human extinction. He claims that his motivation is due to a desire to answer the big questions of life and to continue life as long as possible. Van Nedervelde is on the Board of World Technology Award Judges, Materials category for the World Technology Network; appointed advisor to the board of the now defunct Extropy Institute; on the Board of Advisors to Adaptive A.I. Inc., the parent company of SmartAction; one of the signators to the 2014 Technoprogressive Declaration; a regular speaker at Humanity+'s annual Transvisions Conference; a speaker on Coast to Coast AM, speaking on weaponized nanotechnology and smartdust; and cited by the Human Enhancement Study sponsored by the European Parliament's Science and Technology Options Assessment.

=== Virtual reality expert ===
Van Nedervelde was an early developer in virtual reality. His views on the future of virtual reality were featured in the 2010 documentary Inside the Metaverse. He predicted, in the coming decades, virtual reality will simulate a copy of Earth and have an impact on nearly every aspect of life for most people on this planet. He is the founder of E-spaces, a virtual reality and 3D graphics studio; the patent-filing inventor of C-Thru, applying VR to security systems; and co-CEO of X3D Technologies, Inc., a virtual worlds production company co-founded and co-owned by Hollywood movie-director Michael Bay. Van Nedervelde directed E-spaces' production of twelve online 3D training simulators for BP and the broader oil and gas industry to certify well lease operators in the maintenance and troubleshooting of oil and gas well surface equipment. He also developed virtual reality projects for the Munich Airport Center, Simsala Grimm, Virtual Europe, and the transhumanist-themed sculpture in Martine Rothblatt's Teresem Island.

Van Nedervelde coined the phrase "Multi-laterally Assured Pervasive Permanent Sur-/Sous-veillance" (MAPPS) to describe an alternative to the Cold War-era doctrine of mutually assured destruction (MAD). MAPPS describes a situation total surveillance and sousveillance, and thus nobody has the opportunity to plan and deploy a large-scale organized armed aggression.

=== Nanotechnology expert ===
Van Nedervelde was the Executive Director for Europe of the Foresight Institute, a nanotechnology think-tank, from 1997 to 2014. He also holds the position of Global Task Force member for the Center for Responsible Nanotechnology. As Executive Director for Europe, Van Nedervelde interfaced with the media and represents the institute at European Union events, including EU parliamentary hearings. He has spoken at various conferences, including a working group on unconventional security threats, organized in Washington DC by the Strategic Assessments Group (SAG) of the US Central Intelligence Agency's Directorate of Intelligence. Van Nedervelde co-authored the Foresight Guidelines on Molecular Nanotechnology.

=== Lifeboat Foundation ===
Van Nedervelde serves on the board of directors of the Lifeboat Foundation, an organization dedicated to reducing existential threats in the world. He also serves as the International Spokesperson for the foundation, representing it by fundraising, giving multimedia presentations, and addressing the media. Van Nedervelde stated that the foundation's programs fill a gap left by governments and corporations, which "only think short term, so we felt that it was critical for an organization to focus on the long term and worry about existential risks to humanity."

=== 2045 Initiative ===
Van Nedervelde is the Director of International Development for the 2045 Initiative, a non-profit that seeks cybernetic immortality by the year 2045. He served as the keynote speaker and engaged the audience with science and technology goals during the 2013 Global Future 2045 conference at the Lincoln Center in New York.
