= Russian Party of Pensioners for Social Justice =

Russian Party of Pensioners for Social Justice Российская партия пенсионеров за социальную справедливость
- Abbreviation: RPPSJ (English); RPPSS (Russian)
- Leader: Erik Prazdnikov
- Founder: Sergei Atroshenko
- Founded: 29 November 1997; 28 years ago 5 April 2012; 14 years ago (refoundation)
- Dissolved: 28 October 2006; 19 years ago
- Merged into: A Just Russia (2006–2012)
- Headquarters: Moscow
- Membership: 1,000
- Ideology: Pensioners' interests; Elderly interests; Social justice; Single-issue politics
- Political position: Centre to centre-right
- Colours: Red
- State Duma: 0 / 450
- Seats in the Regional Parliaments: 32 / 3,994

Website
- pensionerparty.ru

The Russian Party of Pensioners for Social Justice (RPPSJ; Russian: Российская партия пенсионеров за социальную справедливость, РППСС, romanized: Rossiyskaya partiya pensionerov za sotsialnuyu spravedlivost, RPPSS), commonly shortened to the Party of Pensioners (Russian: Партия пенсионеров, romanized: Partiya pensionerov) is a registered political party in Russia.

The party was founded as the Party of Pensioners (Общественно-Политичеcкая организация) in 1997. On 29 November 1997 Sergei Atroshenko was elected as the first chairman. On 29 May 1998 the party was registered with the Ministry of Justice. In the December 1999 State Duma elections the party won 1.95% of the vote.

== History ==
On 1 December 2001 the party was given its present name. On 15 May 2002 RPP was registered with the Ministry of Justice.

At the legislative elections, 7 December 2003, the alliance of the Russian Pensioners' Party and the Russian Social Justice Party won 3.1% of the popular vote and no seats.

On 31 January 2004, in an extraordinary congress of the party, chairman Sergei Atroshenko was dismissed from his post for their poor performance.

On 27 March 2005 Valery Gartung was elected chairman.

Between 2004 and 2005 RPP has been able to hold candidates in the elections of the parliaments of 12 regions. Their highest result was 20.7% in elections for Magadan Oblast's Regional Duma on 22 May 2005.

On 9 October 2005 RPP won elections in Tomsk, receiving 19.8% of the vote, compared to United Russia's 17.85%.

On 17 December 2005 an extraordinary congress was held to elect new members. Igor L. Zotov was elected Chairman.

The Russian Pensioners' Party merged with the Russian Party of Life and Rodina into a new party, Fair Russia, on 28 October 2006.

After the merger on 2 September 2007 supporters of the Russian Party of Pensioners created its own Russian public organization "Russian pensioner for Justice" which brought together 88,000 seniors in some 60 regional organizations (Igor L. Zotov became the Chairman of the organization). The organization conducted independent social and political activity aimed at protection of interests of pensioners and low income citizens, came forward with public legislative initiative of the Pension Code adoption in the Russian Federation.

On 29 February 2012 the General Council of the organization led by the Russian Federation State Duma Deputy Igor L. Zotov decided to convert the public organization "Russian pensioners for Justice" into political party "Russian Pensioners For Justice Party" during the next Congress on 7 April 2012 in Moscow.

The current Head of the Central council of the Party is Vladimir Burakov.

In 2018 the party announced that they would support incumbent president Vladimir Putin in the 2018 presidential election. Putin ultimately won with approximately 77% of the vote.

In 2023 the party again announced that they support incumbent president Vladimir Putin in the 2024 presidential election.

== The Party's names ==
- The Party of Pensioners (1997–2001)
- "The Russian Party of Pensioners" (2001–2006)
- Public organization "Russian Pensioners" (2007–2012)
- "The Russian Party of Pensioners for Justice" (2012–2017)
- “The Russian Party of Pensioners for Social Justice” (since 2017)

== Major policies ==
The Party of Pensioners finds its main goal in implementing the rights of the older generation and improving the quality of its life.

The party stands for:

- Stopping of the reduction of medical institutions under the state program of the so-called "optimization";
- Increasing health expenditures at the expense of the state budget;
- Radical pension reform aimed at increasing the “replacement ratio” (the ratio of pensions and wages);
- Developing a system for providing medical and social services for long-term care for the senior citizens and people with disabilities;
- Eliminating interregional differences in the accessibility of medical care and health development;
- Creating the only transparent and unchangeable procedure for determining the size of pensions, which would never depend on political and economic changes.

The Party is against:

- Raising prices for medical equipment, drugs and implantable medical devices;
- Reducing the number of rehabilitation and sanitation facilities, institutions adapted for the needs of the people with disabilities;
- Raising the retirement age and the abolition of the cumulative part of the retirement pension;
- The uncontrolled growth of utility tariffs and the collection of charges for capital repairs from citizens over 50 years old.

The Party calls for:

- Providing the working pensioners with full pension indexation;
- Establishing benefits for the citizens who take care of their aged relatives;
- Introducing public monitoring of prices and the range of essential medicines needed for the older people;
- Starting the creation of gerontological centers in the regions and ensuring the stimulation of gerontological research at the expense of the state budget;
- Creating a unified pension system based on equality, without dividing the people into "ordinary" and "officials", as well as without methods of calculating pensions which differ from one another;
- Establishing legislatively a list of social guarantees provided to every Russian citizen who has lost his job or has found oneself in a difficult situation.

== Electoral results ==
=== Presidential ===
Election	Candidate	First round		Second round		Result
Election	Candidate	Votes	%	Votes	%	Result
2000	Did not contest					
2004	Did not contest					
2008	Party was part of A Just Russia and did not participate in the elections					
2012	Endorsed Vladimir Putin	46,602,075	63.60	—N/a		Won
2018	Endorsed Vladimir Putin	56,430,712	76.69	—N/a		Won
2024	Endorsed Vladimir Putin	76,277,708	88.48	—N/a		Won

=== State Duma ===
Election	Party leader	Performance					Rank	Government
Election	Party leader	Votes	%	± pp	Seats	+/–	Rank	Government
1999	Sergei Atroshenko	1,298,971	1.95%	New	1 / 450	New	9th	Minority
2003	Sergei Atroshenko	1,874,973	3.09% (RPP-PSS)	▲1.14	1 / 450	0	▲8th	Minority
2007	Igor Zotov	Party was part of A Just Russia and did not participate in the elections						Extra-parliamentary
2011	Igor Zotov	Party was part of A Just Russia and did not participate in the elections						Extra-parliamentary
2016	Vladimir Burakov	910,848	1.73%	▲1.73	0 / 450	0	▲7th	Extra-parliamentary
2021	Vladimir Burakov	1,381,890	2.45%	▲0.73	0 / 450	0	▲6th	Extra-parliamentary
2026	Erik Prazdnikov	1,286,329	1.94%	▼0.51	0 / 450	0	6th	Extra-parliamentary
