= K. N. Toosi University of Technology =

Public research university in Tehran, Iran

Khajeh Nasir Toosi University of Technology
- Other names: Khajeh Nasir, KNTU
- Type: Public research university
- Established: 1928; 98 years ago
- Affiliations: Ministry of Science
- Academic affiliations: FUIW
- President: Amir Reza Shahani
- Faculty: 358
- Administrative staff: 150
- Students: 8,100
- Undergraduates: 4,300
- Postgraduates: 3,000
- Doctoral students: 750
- Location: Tehran, Iran; 35.7626°N 51.4128°E
- Campus: Urban
- Newsletter: Nasir Newsletter
- Colors: Dark blue
- Website: en.kntu.ac.ir

The Khajeh Nasir Toosi University of Technology (KNTU; Persian: دانشگاه صنعتی خواجه نصيرالدين طوسی) is a public research university in Tehran, Iran. It is named after medieval Persian scholar Khajeh Nasir Toosi. The university is considered one of the most prestigious institutions of higher education in Iran. Acceptance to the university is highly competitive, entrance to undergraduate and graduate programs typically requires scoring among the top 1% of students in the Iranian University Entrance Exam.

== History ==
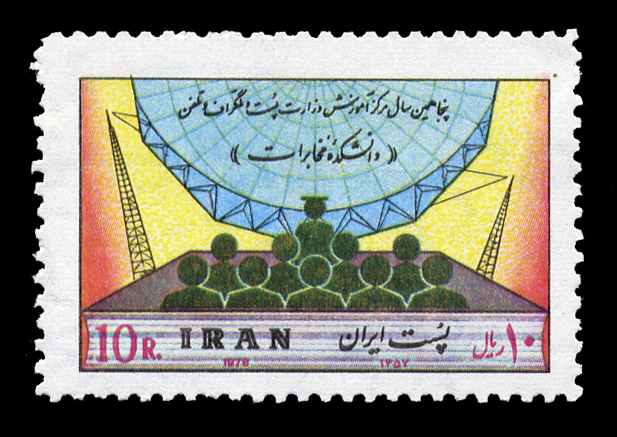
50th Anniversary Commemoration Stamp

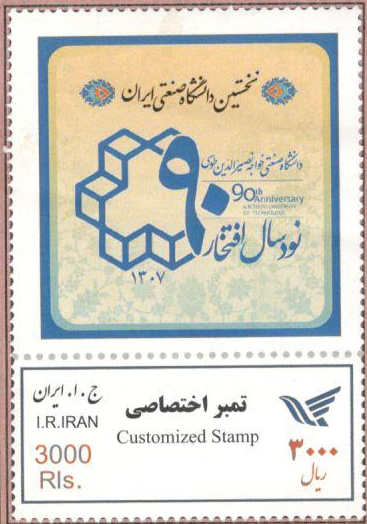
The stamp of 90th anniversary of K. N. Toosi University of Technology

The university was founded in 1928, during the reign of Reza Shah Pahlavi, in Tehran and was named the "Institute of Communications" (Persian: دانشکده مخابرات). It is therefore considered to be the oldest surviving academic institution across the country. (Iran had universities 800 to 2000 years ago from which only the name, ruins and scientific history have survived.)

This institute was later expanded with an Electronic and Electrical Power Engineering department. The 50th anniversary of the establishment of this academic institute was celebrated in 1978, and a commemorative stamp was published by the Post of Iran, before the Islamic Revolution of 1979 (see photo).

The department of Civil Engineering was founded in 1955 as an Institute of Surveying. This institute was later joined by the Institutes of Hydraulic Engineering and Structural Engineering. The department of Mechanical Engineering was founded in 1973. These institutes of higher education were formally integrated in 1980 and named "Technical and Engineering University Complex". As a general practice of paying tribute to the scientific and scholastic figures of the nation, the university was renamed in 1984 "Khajeh Nassir-Al-Deen Toosi (K. N. Toosi) University of Technology". It is affiliated with the Ministry of Science, Research and Technology of Iran.

As of 2012, the university is planning high-tech projects, including the production of a new satellite called 'Saar' (Starling) as well as radar-evading coatings for aircraft. The university's scientific board are also involved in many industrial projects, including the building of satellite carriers and an indigenous eight-seat helicopter.

=== Attack on the university ===
On November 29, 1401, as a part of the suppression 2022 Iranian Uprising, agents of the special unit along with a large number of forces attacked this university and arrested many people. According to Amir Kabir newspaper, after the announcement of a protest rally by the students of Khwaja Nasir on Sunday, December 1st, since this morning, plainclothes forces, who were brought from outside the university in coordination with the Basij of Khwaja Nasir University, occupied the college campus. They tried to prevent students from holding a protest rally by installing Hezbollah flags in the college. They also tried to provoke the feelings of the protesting students by using obscenities towards Mirhossein Mousavi and Mehdi Karroubi.

Also, from the beginning of the day, university security prevented students from other faculties from entering the Faculty of Civil Engineering to participate in the rally. When the number of students behind the doors of the college reached more than 500 people, the special forces and law enforcement arrived at the place and dispersed the students from the front of the college. Then the forces of the special unit and the anti-riot guard took control of the entrance and prevented the students from entering the university. The students of other faculties, who faced the obstruction of the police force and the special unit, went to the Faculty of Mechanics of this university and held their gathering in that faculty. Singing slogans, the students demanded the release of Ali Parvez and Sohail Mohammadi and condemned the repressive policies of the coup government in the university.

On the other hand, the students of the Faculty of Civil Engineering started their rally despite the pressures of the university mobilization and uniform forces. At this time, uniformed forces and Basij members attacked the students and prevented them from continuing their gathering by fighting with the students.

According to the students, one of the members of the Basij of the 86th Entrance University named "Akhwan", who is known as the person in charge of the analysis and tactics of the student mobilization, was in charge of directing the repressive forces and threatened the protesting students with extensive arrests and suppression of the university atmosphere.

Ali Parvez, the detained student of this university, has contacted his family only once so far and there is no information about the status of his case and there are serious concerns about his health. According to the report of Amir Kabir newsletter, a bail of 150 million tomans has been set for Sohail Mohammadi, another detained student, who has faced his objection to the bail amount.

The president of Khaje nassir toosi University of Technology said regarding the creation of a space for protest and discussion for students in the university environment: this university is one of the universities that has provided the most space for students to protest. Our document is also the day when Mr. Ali Bahadri Jahormi, the government spokesman, was invited to our university. We chose the best amphitheater of the university for this meeting and tried to show our goodwill. We also announced to all the students, including those aligned and not aligned with the recent events, to attend the meeting.

The president of Khaje nassir toosi University of Technology stressed that arresting students is not within the authority of the university and said: None of the arrested students have been arrested in the internal environment of the university and we are still working for the release of the detained students, whose number is also very small. Emphasizing that none of the cases of arresting students have taken place in the university, he added: So far, none of the security forces have entered the university in any way, and students have not been arrested even within the university. Arresting students is not at all within the scope of the duties of university presidents and within the framework of the university, and these cases are not coordinated with the university presidents in advance. Since these are security incidents, the necessary follow-ups are also carried out within the scope of security devices.

The president of Khaje nassir toosi University of Technology stated: In these cases, the security agencies take action because of their intelligence aristocracy, which is definitely much, much stronger than the university, and the university is not involved in arresting students at all.

== Notable alumni ==
- Hamidreza Zareipour professor at University of Calgary
- Moaven Razavi Scientist and Member of Faculty, Brandeis University, MA, USA
- Hadi Meidani assistant professor at University of Illinois at Urbana–Champaign
- Hessam Mirgolbabaei assistant professor at University of Minnesota
- Ashkan Ashrafi professor at university at San Diego State University.
- Danial Faghihi assistant professor at University at Buffalo.
- Sadegh Azizi lecturer at University of Leeds.
- Hossein Sayadi assistant professor at California State University, Long Beach.
- Ramtin Hadidi assistant professor at Clemson University.
- Amir AghaKouchak professor at University of California, Irvine.
- Farshid Vahedifard CEE Advisory Board Endowed Professor at Mississippi State University.
- Ehsan Ghazanfari associate professor at University of Vermont.
- Mohammad Amin Hariri-Ardebili Research associate at University of Colorado Boulder.
- Mahmood Yahyai adjunct professor at Morgan State University.
- Mohammad Moghimi assistant professor at Northern Illinois University.
- Farhad Jazaei assistant professor at University of Memphis.
- Omeed Momeni associate professor at University of California, Davis.
- Majid Beidaghi assistant professor at Auburn University.
- Mehdi Mortazavi assistant professor at Western New England University.
- Mohammad Aliabadi former vice president and Head of Physical Education Organization of Iran, was also President of the National Olympic Committee of Islamic Republic of Iran from 2008 to 2014
- Mohammad Ardakani was the minister of cooperatives and governor of Qom province
- Ali Motahari Representative of Shabestar in the 8th elections of Islamic Consultative Assembly
- Ali-Akbar Mousavi Khoeini was elected as a Member of Parliament in the 6th Parliament of Iran
- Farzad Hassani actor
- Aidin Bozorgi mountain climber, disappeared in Broad Peak
- Mahmoud Ghandi politician

== Rankings ==
University rankings
- K. N. Toosi University of Technology

Global – Overall
- CWTS World: 700 (2020)
- THE World: 801-1000 (2021)
- USNWR Global: 1288 (2021)

In the university rankings announced by the Times Higher Education Supplement in September 2016, K. N. Toosi University of Technology was ranked among the top 5 universities in Iran and in the range of 601 to 800 top universities in the world.

Also ranked 501-575th in QS World University Rankings in 2025 in the Electrical and Mechanical Engineering field.

In 2020 Round University Ranking-Clarivate announced that it had achieved 470th place in the world overall ranking.

== Faculties ==
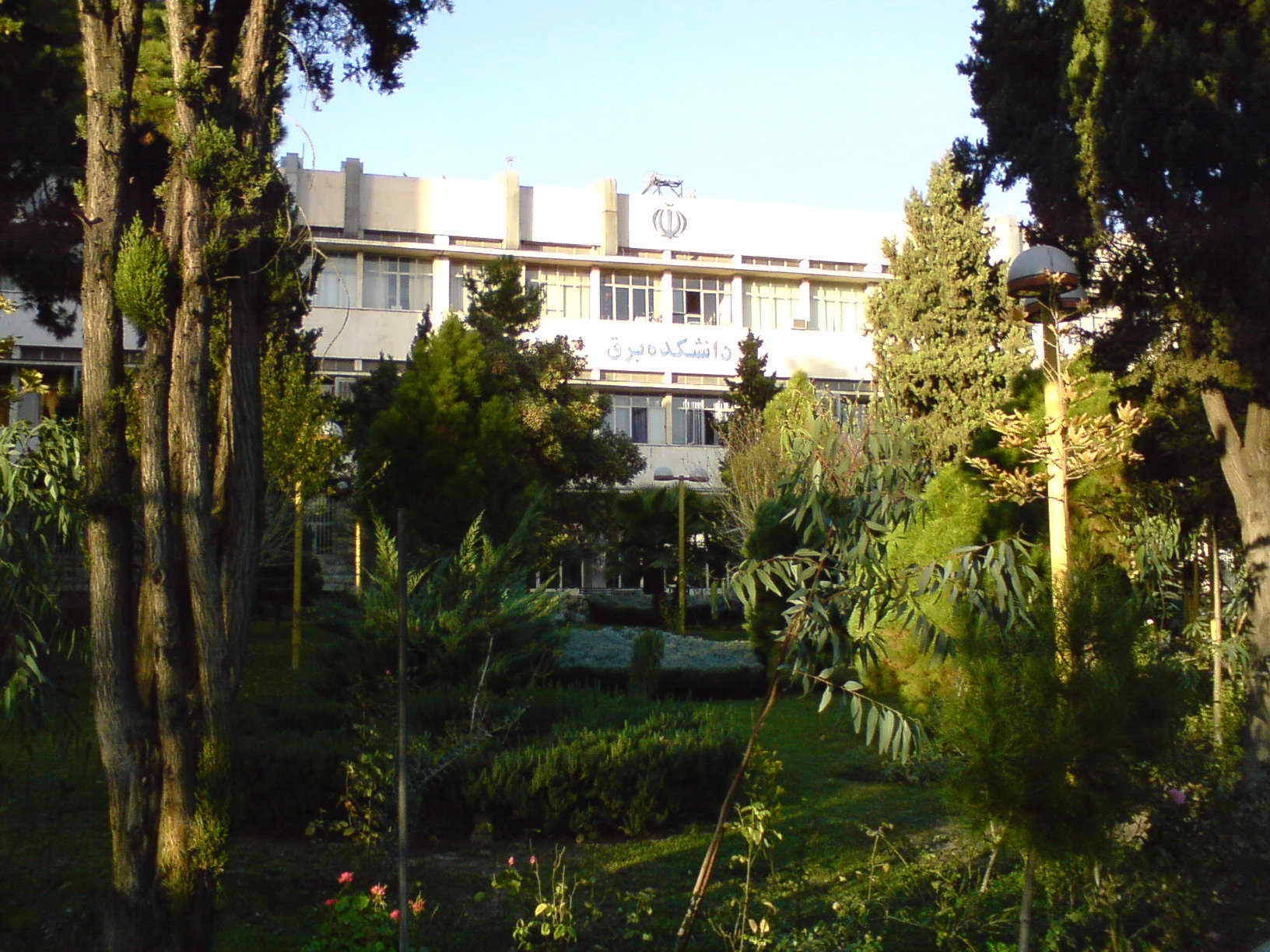
Faculty of Electrical Engineering

The faculties of this university were founded as follows :

- Faculty of Electrical Engineering (1928)
- Faculty of Mechanical Engineering (1973)
- Faculty of Civil Engineering (1955)
- Faculty of Industrial Engineering (1998)
- Faculty of Geodesy and Geomatics Engineering (1955)
- Faculty of Aerospace Engineering (2004)
- Faculty of Computer Engineering
- Faculty of Materials Science and Engineering
- Faculty of Chemistry
- Faculty of Physics
- Faculty of Mathematics
- The E-Learning Center (2004)

Due to the varied origins of K. N. Toosi University of Technology, the faculties are not concentrated in one campus. As a result, the university has five campuses and a central building. However, the plan for centralizing the university is underway.

Each faculty has its own computer center, library and education services office. All libraries are attached to the Simorgh library network. Housing facilities are available for men, women and couples. There are sports facilities on all campuses. The university is programming the development of a branch in Venezuela and research centers in Tehran.

The Central Building on Mirdamad Ave., Tehran, is the managing body of the university and the presidency, all vice presidencies, the central academic services and registrar's office are in this building. Management of education services happens through the Golestan education management system, while research is managed via the Sepid research management system.

== Programs ==
The university offers Bachelor's (B.S.) degrees in more than 20 and Master's (M.S.) degrees in 50 academic fields. It also has 28 PhD programs. It hosts more than five joint educational programs at B.S. and M.S. levels. The courses have industrial orientation on a broad base. The university has 250 full-time faculty members. The total number of students is about 7,000.

== Faculty of Electrical & Computer Engineering ==
Faculty of Electrical and Computer Engineering was founded in 1928. It is the main and the oldest faculty of K. N. Toosi University of Technology.

It is also the first electrical engineering school in Iran. The faculty has more than 70 full-time faculty members. It is among the best electrical engineering schools in Iran, especially in graduate studies in the field of Communications, Controls, and Biomedical Engineering. The Faculty of Computer Engineering was founded in 2014 after separating from the Faculty of Electrical Engineering.

It offers the following programs:

B.Sc.	M.Sc.	Ph.D.
	Biomedical Engineering	Biomedical Engineering
Electrical Engineering: Communications	Communications	Communications
Electrical Engineering: Control	Control	Control
Electrical Engineering: Electronics	Electronics	Electronics
Electrical Engineering: Power Engineering	Power Engineering	Power Engineering
Computer Engineering: Hardware	Artificial Intelligence	Artificial Intelligence
Computer Engineering: Software	Artificial Intelligence	Artificial Intelligence
Aerospace Engineering: Astronautical	Astronautical Engineering	Astronautical Engineering

These faculties are at Seyedkhandan Bridge, beside the Ministry of Communication. A recreational center is on this campus.

- Coordinates: 35.7390°N 51.4486°E
- Official website: www.ee.kntu.ac.ir, www.ce.kntu.ac.ir

== Faculty of Aerospace Engineering ==
This is the youngest of the KNTU faculties. Its core was formed as Aerospace group in the Faculty of Mechanical Engineering in 2000. It provided MSc programs in aerodynamics, propulsion, flight dynamics and aerospace structures. In 2001, it launched the first MSc program in space machinery engineering in Iran.

In 2004, the BSc joint aerospace engineering program with MATI (Moscow State Aviation Technological University) was launched. In 2006, the Faculty had officially become independent from the Mechanical Engineering faculty and the first group of BSc state students were admitted through the Iranian University Entrance Examinations.

During the years 2000-2007 the faculty used the facilities of the Mechanical Engineering Faculty. In June 2007, the Faculty of Mechanical Engineering moved to its new campus, and the faculty became independent. Some of the facilities of the Faculty of Mechanical Engineering (such as workshops) were kept on the Aerospace Engineering campus.

The campus is on University Boulevard, Vafadar St., Tehranpars. It has a large library that is being equipped. The aerospace engineering student accommodation is just beside the faculty. The Nasir Gym (K. N. Toosi University of Technology's newest recreational building) is also beside the faculty. There are plans for building recreational facilities, including a gym, at this site. The workshop complex of the university is ont this campus.

There are about 170 students studying at the faculty and there are 10 full-time faculty members. The faculty also uses many part-time professors, usually from the Faculty of Mechanical Engineering. The first group of joint program students were sent to Russia in August 2007. The faculty is going to launch its P.H.D program in 2008.

The faculty was the host of the sixth national and second international Conference of the Iranian Aerospace Society. A new research Center was established at the faculty in 2007, conducting industrial research in aerospace. There are research laboratories at the faculty, including:

- MDO Lab
- Control Lab
- Combustion and Propulsion Research Lab
- Aerodynamics Lab and Wind tunnel
- Parallel Processing Lab
- Space Research Lab

The table below shows the programs available at the faculty:

B.Sc.	M.Sc.	Ph.D.
Aerospace Engineering	Aerospace Engineering (Propulsion)	Aerospace Engineering (Propulsion)
Aerospace Engineering (Joint Program with MATI University, Russia)	Aerospace Engineering (Aerodynamics)	Aerospace Engineering (Flight Dynamics and Control)
	Aerospace Engineering (Space Machinery)	Aerospace Engineering (Joint Program with MATI University, Russia)
	Aerospace Engineering (Flight Dynamics and Control)	
	Aerospace Engineering (Aerospace Structures)	

== Faculty of Civil Engineering ==
This faculty comprises six groups: Earthquake engineering-water engineering-soil engineering-structural engineering-transportation engineering-environmental engineering.

It offers the following programs:

B.Sc.	M.Sc.	Ph.D.
Civil Engineering	Water: Water Resources	Applied Designing
	Water: Hydraulics	Structural Engineering
	Environment	Soil and Foundation Engineering
	Earthquake	
	Structures	
	Hydraulic Structures	
	Road and Transportation	
	Soil Mechanics and Foundations	
	Marine Structures	

The campus is jointly used by this faculty and the Faculty of Geodesy and Geomatics Engineering. The library contains about 7,000 books in Persian, 6,000 books in English and other foreign languages, 130 journals in different languages, and 150 thesis and research reports. The university's bookshop is on this campus. There is a housing facility and some sport facilities. The faculty has several fully equipped labs used for research or teaching.

The laboratories are as follows:

- Structural Engineering Laboratories: Concrete, Structures, Mechanics of Materials, Materials of Construction.
- Water Engineering Laboratories: Hydrology, Hydraulics, and Hydraulic Models.
- Road and Transportation Engineering Laboratories: Pavement Properties
- Soil and Foundation Engineering Laboratories: Soil Mechanics Laboratory
- Earthquake Engineering Laboratories: Structural Dynamics Laboratory, including ambient and forced vibration testing devices for the evaluation and measurement of the dynamic characteristics of the existing structures, as well as an earthquake computer site.
- Environmental Engineering Laboratories: Water and Waste Water Chemistry, Redundant Solid Materials, and Microbiology.

This faculty is expert in concrete engineering and has won national and international awards for its achievements in this field. These include first place in 2002 and 2003, second place in 2001. and third place in 2004 in the cement competitions of the American Concrete Institute (ACI). They have been awarded third place in the bridge design and construction with Balsa wood competition in 2003. The students publish a scientific journal named Abanegan آبانگان dedicated to water engineering.

The faculty has 28 full-time faculty members. It is at Valiasr St., opposite the Eskan towers. Student accommodation, a recreational center and the university's bookshop is on this campus.

== The E-Learning Center ==
In 2004 K. N. Toosi University of Technology started its E-Learning programs. The following programs are available:

- Bsc in Industrial Engineering (system analysis)
- Bsc in IT
- Bsc in Computer Engineering
- Msc in Industrial Engineering (system analysis)
- Msc in IT (information systems engineering)

This center is in the central building of the university (Mirdamad Ave.).

== Faculty of Geodesy and Geomatics Engineering ==
The educational activities of this faculty started in 1954 as Geomatics Institute. This was shortly after the establishment of the Geomatics Organization of Iran. The mission of the newly established Geomatics Institute was mainly to train professional geomatics workforce for governmental organizations. In 1980, this institute joined the newly established K. N. Toosi University of Technology. Initially it was known as the Faculty of Civil Engineering and the geodesy and geomatics engineering was one of the departments. With the expansion of the university, in 2001, this department made an independent faculty under the name of Geodesy and Geomatics Engineering to meet the growing demand.

As the first faculty of Geodesy and Geomatics Engineering in Iran, this faculty is recognized as one of the leading educational and research centers of Iran in geodesy and geomatics engineering. With more than 20 full-time faculty members, this faculty offers programs in graduate and undergraduate levels.

It offers the following programs:

B.Sc.	M.Sc.	Ph.D.
Geomatics Engineering (formerly Surveying Engineering)	Geodesy	Geodesy
	Photogrammetry	Photogrammetry
	Remote Sensing	Remote Sensing
	GIS	GIS

This faculty is located at Valiasr St., opposite the Eskan towers.

== Faculty of Industrial Engineering ==
In 1993, the Department of Industrial Engineering was formed in the Faculty of Mechanical Engineering. In 1999, this department was separated from the Faculty of Mechanical Engineering to continue its activities as an independent Faculty.

Programs and degrees presented at the Faculty of Industrial Engineering:

B.Sc.	M.Sc.	Ph.D.
Industrial Production	Industrial Engineering	Industrial Engineering
Systems Analysis and Planning	IT	
	E-Commerce	
	MBA	

Laboratories:

- precision measurement and quality control
- simulation
- information technology
- industrial systems and automation
- advanced design and production and robotics
- strategic intelligence (SIRLAB)
- time and motion study

Research capabilities and interests:

- Air Traffic Flow Management & Ground Holding Problem
- Information technology: Electronic commerce
- Quality control systems in production processes
- Quality management systems
- Planning and production control
- Maintenance systems
- Industrial design based on human being factors
- Analysis of ergonomic problems
- Analysis of industrial systems using computer simulation
- Internet marketing
- ISCM
- e-CRM
- Commercial intelligence
- Decision making in trade and industry
- ERP

This faculty is in the Mollasadra building, Pardis St., Mollasadra St., Vanak Sq. It also operates a building at Seyedkhandan Bridge, Dabestan Alley.

== Faculty of Mechanical Engineering ==
Faculty of Mechanical Engineering was founded in 1973.

In June 2007, the Faculty of Mechanical Engineering moved to its new campus. The faculty has 44 full-time faculty members.

It offers the following programs:

B.Sc.	M.Sc.	Ph.D.
Mechanical Engineering (Thermo-fluid)	Mechatronics	Energy Conversion
Mechanical Engineering (Solids)	Applied Design	Applied Design
	Energy Conversion	Manufacturing
	Manufacturing Technology and Processes	
	Material science	
	Sensing and Control Systems	
	Energy Systems	
	Automotive Engineering	

This faculty is in the Mollasadra building, Pardis St., Mollasadra St., Vanak Sq.

== Faculty of Science ==
The ex-Faculty of Basic Sciences started its activities in 1980 by presenting basic science courses to engineering students of different disciplines. In 1987, the expansion of the Faculty allowed admission of undergraduate applied science students and the name was altered to Faculty of Science.

The Faculty consists of four departments: Applied Chemistry, Applied Physics, Mathematics, and the Department of General Courses. The latter department provides courses in theology and ethics, Persian literature, English, and physical education.

This faculty is at Kavian St., Jolfa St., Shariati St. A recreational center is on this campus.

This faculty provides the following programs:

B.Sc.	M.Sc.	Ph.D.
Applied Chemistry	Physical Chemistry	Electrochemistry
Pure Mathematics	Organic Chemistry	Physical Chemistry
Applied Mathematics	Inorganic Chemistry	Organic Chemistry
Solid State Physics	Analytical Chemistry	Analytical Chemistry
	Pure Mathematics	Pure Mathematics (functional analysis)
	Applied Mathematics	Pure Mathematics (harmonic analysis)
	Nuclear Physics	Pure Mathematics (algebra-modules and loops)
	Solid State Physics	Pure Mathematics (algebra-algebrical number theory)
		Pure mathematics (finite groups theory)
		Applied mathematics (operational research)
		Applied mathematics (numerical analysis)

== Faculty of Materials science and engineering ==
The K. N. Toosi University of Technology (KNTU) began its activities in the field of Materials Science and Engineering in 2001, with the establishment of a M.Sc. degree in Characterization and Selection of Engineering Materials Program, as a sub-branch of the Faculty of Mechanical Engineering. In 2010, the activities and scope of the Materials Program were expanded to offer a Ph.D. degree, followed in 2011 by another M.Sc. degree in Metals Forming and a B.Sc. degree in Industrial Metallurgy.

In the year 2013, with the approval of KNTU as well as the Council for Promoting Higher Education in the Ministry of Science, Research and Technology, the Materials Program was promoted into the Faculty of Materials Science and Engineering. The faculty began its e-Learning Program, offering M.Sc. degrees in Characterization and Selection of Engineering Materials in 2013, and Metals Forming in 2016. Another M.Sc. degree in Nanomaterials was launched in 2017. The Faculty of Materials Science and Engineering now hosts 11 full-time faculty members.

== Joint international programs ==
KNTU is collaborating in research and teaching programs with many universities around the world. In this regard, memoranda of understanding have been signed between KNTU and universities from Australia, Canada, Cyprus, France, Germany, Russia, and the United Kingdom.

The courses in most international programs are offered in English. Admission to these programs is either through the National Entrance Exam (Konkoor) or through special exams conducted by KNTU. The tuition fee varies for each program. The following joint international programs are active:

- MSc program in Remote Sensing and Geographic Information Systems with the International Institute for Aerospace Survey and Earth Sciences (ITC), the Netherlands.
- MSc program in Automotive Engineering with Kingston University, London, UK.
- MSc program in Energy Systems with University of Manchester, Manchester, UK.
- BSc program in Aerospace Engineering with Moscow State University of Aerospace Technology (MATI), Moscow, Russia.
- Phd program in Aerospace Engineering with Moscow State University of Aerospace Technology (MATI), Moscow, Russia.

== Research ==
K. N. Toosi University of Technology is known for its industrial relations. It conducts research for many companies such as Iran Khodro, Saipa, Aerospace Industries Organization. Research is conducted in all the KNTU laboratories and even research groups such as ARAS exist within faculties. The Launch Vehicle research center has started its work at the faculty of Aerospace Engineering, one of the first centers of its kind. There are several centers of excellence at this university including the following:

- Center of Excellence in liquid propellant launch vehicle design
- Center of excellence in space engineering
- Center of excellence in robotics and control
- Center of excellence in materials and modern structures
- Center of excellence in energy systems and fluids

There are several research centers at this university including:

- Space Systems Research Center

There are several research laboratories at this university including:

- Propulsion and Combustion Research laboratory (Faculty of Aerospace Engineering)
- MDO (multidisciplinary design optimization) Research laboratory (Faculty of Aerospace Engineering)
- Space Research laboratory (Faculty of Aerospace Engineering)
- Aerodynamics Research laboratory (Faculty of Aerospace Engineering)
- Subsonic wind tunnel (Faculty of Aerospace Engineering)
- Parallel processing Research laboratory (Faculty of Aerospace Engineering)
- Multiphase Flow Laboratory (Faculty of Mechanical Engineering)
- Actuators Research laboratory (Faculty of Mechanical Engineering)
- Vibrations and Automobiles Research laboratory (Faculty of Mechanical Engineering)
- Virtual Reality Research laboratory (Faculty of Mechanical Engineering)
- Composite Research laboratory (Faculty of Mechanical Engineering)
- Fracture Mechanics Research laboratory (Faculty of Mechanical Engineering)
- Instrumentation and Control Research laboratory (Faculty of Mechanical Engineering)
- Combustion Research laboratory (Faculty of Mechanical Engineering)
- Turbomachinery Research laboratory (Faculty of Mechanical Engineering)
- Nano and Materials Research laboratory (Faculty of Mechanical Engineering)
- Robotics Research laboratory (Faculty of Mechanical Engineering)
- Spread Spectrum and Wireless Communications laboratory (Faculty of Electrical Engineering)
- Digital Control Systems Research laboratory (Faculty of Electrical Engineering)
- Industrial Control Research laboratory (Faculty of Electrical Engineering)
- Instrumentation Research laboratory (Faculty of Electrical Engineering)
- Intelligent Systems Research laboratory (Faculty of Electrical Engineering)
- Linear System Theory Research laboratory (Faculty of Electrical Engineering)
- Adaptive Control Systems Research laboratory (Faculty of Electrical Engineering)
- System Identification Research laboratory (Faculty of Electrical Engineering)
- Optimal Control Systems Research laboratory (Faculty of Electrical Engineering)
- Nonlinear Control Systems Research laboratory (Faculty of Electrical Engineering)
- Robust Control Systems Research laboratory (Faculty of Electrical Engineering)
- Robotics Research laboratory (Faculty of Electrical Engineering)
- Guidance and Navigation Research laboratory (Faculty of Electrical Engineering)
- Automation Research laboratory (Faculty of Electrical Engineering)
- Process Control Research laboratory (Faculty of Electrical Engineering)
- Biomedical Engineering Research laboratory (Faculty of Electrical Engineering)
- Biomedical Signal and Image Processing Research laboratory (Faculty of Electrical Engineering)
- Bioelectric Artificial Organs Research laboratory (Faculty of Electrical Engineering)
- Antenna Research laboratory (Faculty of Electrical Engineering)
- Communication Circuits Research laboratory (Faculty of Electrical Engineering)
- DSP (Digital Signal Processing) Research laboratory (Faculty of Electrical Engineering)
- Microwave Research laboratory (Faculty of Electrical Engineering)
- Optical Fibers Research laboratory (Faculty of Electrical Engineering)
- Logical circuits Research laboratory (Faculty of Electrical Engineering)
- Microprocessor Research laboratory (Faculty of Electrical Engineering)
- Computer Networks Research laboratory (Faculty of Electrical Engineering)
- FPGA Research laboratory (Faculty of Electrical Engineering)
- Computer Research laboratory (Faculty of Electrical Engineering)
- Parallel Prossesing Research laboratory (Faculty of Electrical Engineering)
- Computer Architecture Research laboratory (Faculty of Electrical Engineering)
- Digital Electronic Research laboratory (Faculty of Electrical Engineering)
- Electronic Circuits Research laboratory (Faculty of Electrical Engineering)
- High Voltage Laboratory (Faculty of Electrical Engineering)
- Power System Laboratory (Faculty of Electrical Engineering)
- Relaying and Protection Laboratory (Faculty of Electrical Engineering)
- Special Machines Laboratory (Faculty of Electrical Engineering)
- Power Electronics Laboratory (Faculty of Electrical Engineering)
- Electric Machinery Laboratory (Faculty of Electrical Engineering)
- Exact Measurement and Quality Control Research laboratory (Faculty of Industrial Engineering)
- Simulation Research laboratory (Faculty of Industrial Engineering)
- IT (Information Technology) Research laboratory (Faculty of Industrial Engineering)
- Automation and Industrial Systems Research laboratory (Faculty of Industrial Engineering)
- Strategic Intelligence Research laboratory (Faculty of Industrial Engineering)
- Robotics and Design and Manufacturing Research laboratory (Faculty of Industrial Engineering)
- Numerical Computation Research laboratory (Faculty of Science)
- Laser Research laboratory (Faculty of Science)
- Solid-state Physics Research laboratory (Faculty of Science)

There are workshops such as the following, in many of which research is conducted:

- Automechanic Workshop (on the Faculty of AE Eng. campus)
- Casting Workshop (on the Faculty of AE Eng. campus)
- Sheet-metal Workshop (on the Faculty of AE Eng. campus)
- Electrical Engineering Workshop (Faculty of Electrical Engineering)

== Department of applied chemistry ==
The department has 12 full-time faculty members specialized in chemical physics, analytical chemistry, organic and inorganic chemistry, and electrochemistry. Besides the undergraduate program, the department offers an undergraduate program leading to BSc in applied chemistry and graduate programs leading to MSc and PhD degrees in related disciplines.

== Some achievements and honors of the university ==
College of Mechanics Obtaining the third place for the invention of the 12th Kharazmi International Festival for making a glass cutting machine by applying thermal shock (1377)

Obtaining the second rank of applied research of the 18th Khawarzmi International Festival for the design and construction of flying boats (2008).

Winning the first and third place in heart competitions at MIT University (2007)

Obtaining the second place in the applied researches of the Kharazmi international festival for the design and construction of a six-degree-of-freedom robot simulating surgery with indigenous technology and implementation

Necessary algorithms for bone surgery training in virtual environment (2008)

Designing and manufacturing the first 3D printer in Iran (2008)

Design and construction of the first fully electric car made in Iran named Kasedak Naseer (2008)

Obtaining the third rank of developmental research in the 23rd Kharazmi International Festival (2008)

Received recognition from UNIDO, ECO and COLOMBO project

Obtaining the third place in applied research of the 21st Khawarzmi International Festival for the design of the production process and implementation of the T300 carbon fiber line (2008).

Winning many awards by the robotics team of the faculty in the RoboCup world competition (2005-2010)

Faculty of Engineering and Materials Science

The invention of making porous ceramic filters

Selected in the initiative section of the 7th national movement festival: national and university

Department of electrical engineering

Winning the first place of the Bike group headed by Karim Abbaszadeh in the first round of the Energy and Environment Innovators competition

Winning the second place in the first high-performance electric motor national competition by the Nasir Motor team headed by Mohammad Ardabili in 2017

Winning the third place in the Oceania international competition by the Emdadgar robotics team headed by Hamidreza Taghirad in 2017

Winning the first place in the design team of special-purpose integrated circuits under the supervision of Hosseini Nejad in 2017

The brilliance of Aras robotics team in Iran Open 2016

Winning the runner-up position and the best automatic robot in the AUT 2015 competition

Winning the first and third place of kn2c football team in Sharif Cup 2015

Winning the championship position of the vertical flight robotics team of Aras Robotics Group in the IMAV16 China competition

Winning the title of Outstanding Young Scientist in Electrical Engineering by Tawakkel Pakizeh on 5 March 2014

== See also ==
- List of Islamic educational institutions
