= Mind uploading =

Hypothetical process of digitally emulating a brain

Schematic representation of a mind being uploaded from a human brain to a computer

Mind uploading is a hypothetical process of whole brain emulation in which a brain scan is used to completely emulate a person's mental state in a digital computer. The computer would then run a simulation of the brain's information processing, such that it would respond in essentially the same way as the original brain and have a sentient conscious mind.

Substantial mainstream research in related areas is being conducted in neuroscience and computer science, including animal brain mapping and simulation, development of faster supercomputers, virtual reality, brain–computer interfaces, connectomics, and information extraction from dynamically functioning brains. Supporters say many of the tools and ideas needed to achieve mind uploading already exist or are under active development, but they admit that others are, as yet, very speculative, though still in the realm of engineering possibility.

Mind uploading may be accomplished by either of two methods: copy-and-upload or copy-and-delete by gradual replacement of neurons (which can be considered gradual destructive uploading) until the original organic brain no longer exists and a computer program emulating it takes control of the body. In the former method, mind uploading would be achieved by scanning and mapping the salient features of a biological brain and then storing and copying that information into a computer system or another computational device. The biological brain may not survive the copying process or may be deliberately destroyed during it. The simulated mind could be in a virtual reality or simulated world, supported by an anatomic 3D body simulation model. Alternatively, the simulated mind could reside in a computer inside—or either connected to or remotely controlled by—a (not necessarily humanoid) robot, biological, or cybernetic body.

Among some futurists and within part of the transhumanist movement, mind uploading is treated as an important proposed life extension or immortality technology (known as "digital immortality"). Some believe mind uploading is the best way to preserve the human species, as opposed to cryonics. Another aim of mind uploading is to provide a permanent backup to our "mind-file", to enable interstellar space travel, and to be a means for human culture to survive a global disaster by making a functional copy of a human society in a computing device. Some futurists consider whole-brain emulation a "logical endpoint" of computational neuroscience and neuroinformatics, both of which study brain simulation for medical research purposes. It is discussed in artificial intelligence research publications as an approach to strong AI (artificial general intelligence) and to at least weak superintelligence. Another approach is seed AI, which is not based on existing brains. Computer-based intelligence, such as an upload, could think much faster than a biological human, even if it were no more intelligent. A large-scale society of uploads might, according to futurists, give rise to a technological singularity: an exponential development of technology that exceeds human control and becomes unpredictable. Mind uploading is a central conceptual feature of numerous science fiction novels, films, and games.

== Overview ==
Many neuroscientists believe that the human mind is largely an emergent property of the information processing of its neuronal network.

Neuroscientists have said that important functions performed by the mind, such as learning, memory, and consciousness, are due to purely physical and electrochemical processes in the brain and are governed by applicable laws. For example, Christof Koch and Giulio Tononi wrote in IEEE Spectrum:

Consciousness is part of the natural world. It depends, we believe, only on mathematics and logic and on the imperfectly known laws of physics, chemistry, and biology; it does not arise from some magical or otherworldly quality.

Eminent computer scientists and neuroscientists, including Koch and Tononi, Douglas Hofstadter, Jeff Hawkins, Marvin Minsky, Randal A. Koene, and Rodolfo Llinás, have predicted that advanced computers will be capable of thought and even attain consciousness.

Many theorists have presented models of the brain and established a range of estimates of how much computing power is needed for partial and complete simulations. Using these models, some have estimated that uploading may be possible within decades if trends such as Moore's law continue. As of June 2026, this kind of technology is almost entirely theoretical.

== Theoretical benefits and applications ==
=== "Immortality" or backup ===
In theory, if a mind's information and processes can be disassociated from a biological body, they are no longer tied to that body's limits and lifespan. Furthermore, information within a brain could be partly or wholly copied or transferred to one or more other substrates (including digital storage or another brain), thereby—from a purely mechanistic perspective—reducing or eliminating such information's "mortality risk". This general proposal was discussed in 1971 by biogerontologist George M. Martin of the University of Washington. From the perspective of the biological brain, the simulated brain may just be a copy, even if it is conscious and has an indistinguishable character. As such, the original biological being, before the uploading, might consider the digital twin a new and independent being rather than a future self.

=== Space exploration ===
An "uploaded astronaut" could be used instead of a "live" astronaut in human spaceflight, avoiding the perils of zero gravity, the vacuum of space, and cosmic radiation to the human body. It would allow for the use of smaller spacecraft, such as the proposed StarChip, and it would enable virtually unlimited interstellar travel distances.

=== Mind editing ===
Some researchers believe editing human brains is physically possible in theory, for example by performing neurosurgery with nanobots, but it would require particularly advanced technology. Editing an uploaded mind would be much easier, as long as the exact edits to be made are known. This would facilitate cognitive enhancement and the precise control of the emulated beings' well-being, motivations, and personalities.

=== Speed ===
Although the number of neuronal connections in the human brain is very large (around 100 trillions), the frequency of activation of biological neurons is limited to around 200 Hz, whereas electronic hardware can easily operate at multiple GHz. With sufficient hardware parallelism, a simulated brain could thus in theory run faster than a biological brain. Uploaded beings may therefore not only be more efficient but also have a faster rate of subjective experience than biological brains (e.g. experiencing an hour of lifetime in a single second of real time).

== Relevant technologies and techniques ==
The focus of mind uploading, in the case of copy-and-transfer, is on data acquisition, rather than data maintenance of the brain. A set of approaches known as loosely coupled off-loading (LCOL) may be used in an attempt to characterize and copy a brain's mental contents. The LCOL approach may take advantage of self-reports, life-logs, and video recordings that can be analyzed by artificial intelligence. A bottom-up approach may focus on neurons' specific resolution, morphology, and spike times, the times at which they produce potential responses.

=== AI-based "digital self" applications ===
Related to the "loosely coupled off-loading" (LCOL) idea of using self-reports and life-logs to approximate aspects of a person's mental contents, some consumer applications use user-provided text (e.g., journaling) to build conversational AI companions or "digital selves"; this differs from whole-brain emulation because it does not involve brain scanning or simulation of brain tissue. Examples include AI companion/chatbot services such as Replika and Character.AI, and a mobile application called Mind Upload which describes itself as allowing users to "upload your consciousness" by submitting thoughts and memories.

=== Computational complexity ===
Estimates of how much processing power is needed to emulate a human brain at various levels, along with the fastest and slowest supercomputers from TOP500 and a $1000 PC. Note the logarithmic scale. The (exponential) trend line for the fastest supercomputer has a doubling time of 15 months. Kurzweil believes that mind uploading will be possible at neural simulation, while the Sandberg & Bostrom report is less certain about where consciousness arises.

Advocates of mind uploading point to Moore's law to support the notion that the necessary computing power will be available within a few decades. But the actual computational requirements for running an uploaded human mind are very difficult to quantify, potentially rendering such an argument specious.

Regardless of the techniques used to capture or recreate the function of a human mind, the processing demands are likely to be immense, due to the large number of neurons in the human brain along with the considerable complexity of each neuron.

Required computational capacity strongly depends on the chosen level of simulation model scale:

Estimates from Sandberg, Bostrom, 2008
| Level | CPU demand (FLOPS) | Memory demand (Tb) | $1 million super‐computer (Earliest year of making) |
|---|---|---|---|
| Analog network population model | 10^{15} | 10^{2} | 2008 |
| Spiking neural network | 10^{18} | 10^{4} | 2019 |
| Electrophysiology | 10^{22} | 10^{4} | 2033 |
| Metabolome | 10^{25} | 10^{6} | 2044 |
| Proteome | 10^{26} | 10^{7} | 2048 |
| States of protein complexes | 10^{27} | 10^{8} | 2052 |
| Distribution of complexes | 10^{30} | 10^{9} | 2063 |
| Stochastic behavior of single molecules | 10^{43} | 10^{14} | 2111 |

=== Scanning and mapping scale of an individual ===
When modeling and simulating a specific brain, a brain map or connectivity database showing the connections between the neurons must be extracted from an anatomic model of the brain. For whole-brain simulation, this map should show the connectivity of the whole nervous system, including the spinal cord, sensory receptors, and muscle cells. Destructive scanning of a small sample of tissue from a mouse brain including synaptic details is possible as of 2010.

But if short-term memory and working memory include prolonged or repeated firing of neurons as well as intraneural dynamic processes, the electrical and chemical signal state of the synapses and neurons may be hard to extract. The uploaded mind may then perceive a memory loss of the events and mental processes immediately before the brain scanning.

A full brain map has been estimated to occupy less than 2 × 10^{16} bytes (20,000 TB) and would store the addresses of the connected neurons, the synapse type, and the "weight" of each of the brains' 10^{15} synapses. But the biological complexities of true brain function (the epigenetic states of neurons, protein components with multiple functional states, etc.) may preclude an accurate prediction of the volume of binary data required to faithfully represent a functioning human mind.

=== Serial sectioning ===
Serial sectioning of a brain

A possible method for mind uploading is serial sectioning, in which the brain tissue and perhaps other parts of the nervous system are frozen and then scanned and analyzed layer by layer, which, for frozen samples at nano-scale, requires a cryo-ultramicrotome, capturing the structure of the neurons and their interconnections. The exposed surface of frozen nerve tissue would be scanned and recorded, and then the surface layer of tissue removed. While this would be very slow and labor-intensive, research is underway to automate the collection and microscopy of serial sections. The scans would then be analyzed, and a model of the neural net recreated in the system into which the mind was being uploaded.

There is uncertainty with this approach using current microscopy techniques. If it is possible to replicate neuron function from its visible structure alone, then the resolution afforded by a scanning electron microscope and in particular volumetric electron microscopy, would suffice for such a technique. But as the function of brain tissue is partially determined by molecular events (particularly at synapses, but also at other places on the neuron's cell membrane), this may not suffice to capture and simulate neuron functions. It may be possible to extend the techniques of serial sectioning and to capture the internal molecular makeup of neurons, through the use of sophisticated immunohistochemistry staining methods that could then be read via confocal laser scanning microscopy. But as the physiological genesis of mind is not currently known, this method may not be able to access all the biochemical information necessary to recreate a human brain with sufficient fidelity.

=== Brain imaging ===
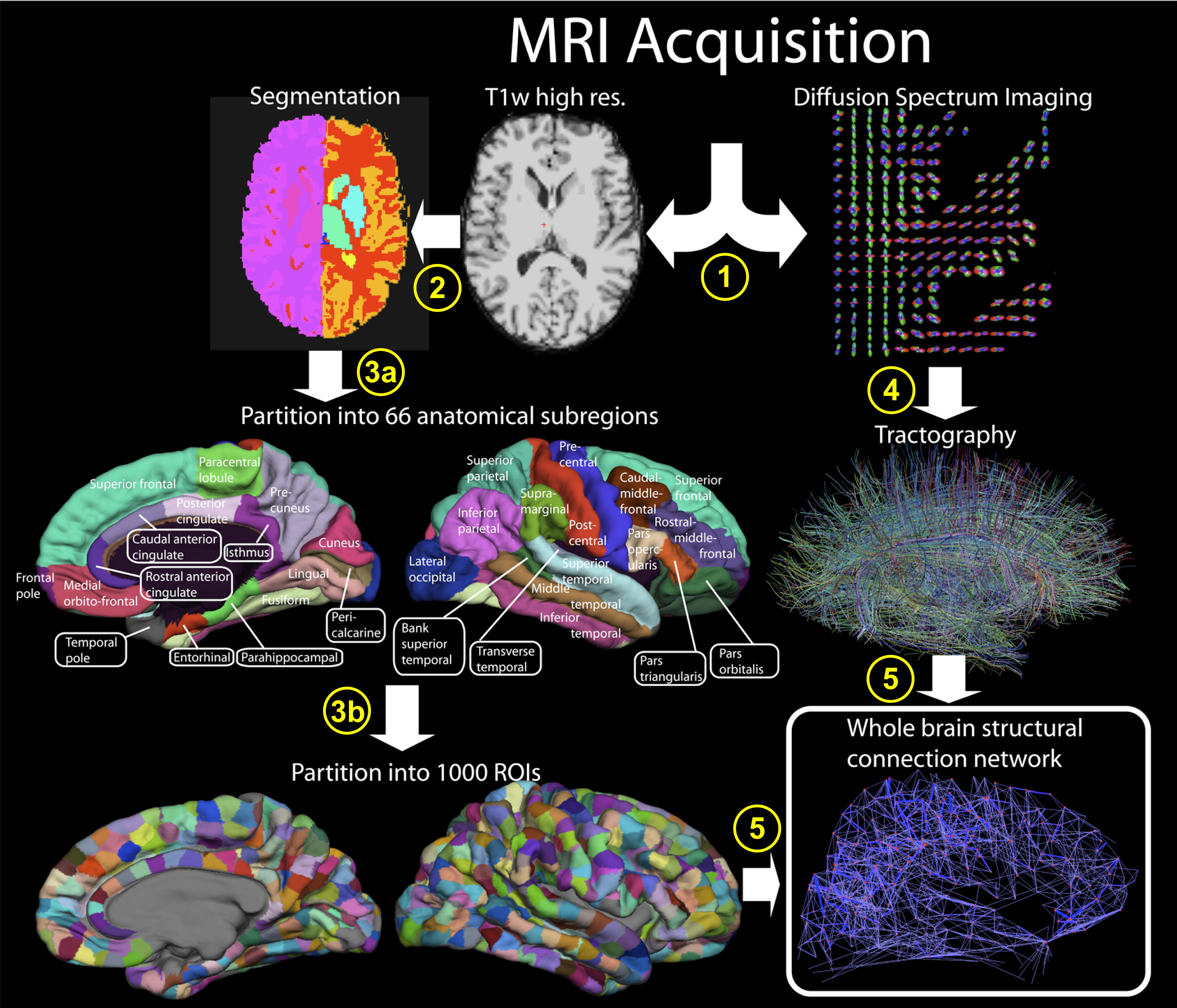
Process from MRI acquisition to the whole brain structural network

Magnetoencephalography

It may be possible to create functional 3D maps of the brain activity, using advanced neuroimaging technology such as functional MRI (fMRI, for mapping change in blood flow), magnetoencephalography (MEG, for mapping of electrical currents), or combinations of multiple methods, to build a detailed three-dimensional model of the brain using non-invasive and non-destructive techniques. Today, fMRI is often combined with MEG to create functional maps of human cortices during more complex cognitive tasks, as the methods complement each other. Even though current imaging technology lacks the spatial resolution needed to gather the information needed for such a scan, important recent and future developments are predicted to substantially improve both spatial and temporal resolution.

=== Brain–computer interfaces ===
Brain–computer interfaces (BCIs) are sometimes discussed as indirectly relevant to mind uploading insofar as they aim to record (and in some cases stimulate) neural activity, but they do not by themselves provide the high-resolution structural and biochemical data typically assumed in whole-brain emulation proposals. Neuralink is a company developing an implantable BCI that uses flexible electrode "threads" inserted by a neurosurgical robot, described in a 2019 technical report in the Journal of Medical Internet Research. In 2024, Neuralink reported its first human implant; scientists noted the work is primarily aimed at assisting people with paralysis and that major challenges remain for long-term safety and performance.

=== Brain simulation ===
Ongoing work in brain simulation includes partial and whole simulations of some animals. For example, the C. elegans roundworm, Drosophila fruit fly, and mouse have all been simulated to various degrees.

The Blue Brain Project, initiated by the Brain and Mind Institute of the École Polytechnique Fédérale de Lausanne, is an attempt to create a synthetic brain by reverse-engineering mammalian brain circuitry in order to accelerate experimental research on the brain. In 2009, after a successful simulation of part of a rat brain, the director, Henry Markram, said, "A detailed, functional artificial human brain can be built within the next 10 years." In 2013, Markram became the director of the new decade-long Human Brain Project. Less than two years later, the project was recognized to be mismanaged and its claims overblown, and Markram was asked to step down.

==== Commercial brain preservation proposals ====
In 2018, startup company Nectome, backed by Y Combinator, proposed a controversial preservation service using aldehyde-stabilized cryopreservation. The company's approach involves connecting terminal patients to a heart-lung machine while under general anesthesia to pump preservation chemicals through the carotid arteries while the person is still alive, a process the company calls "100 percent fatal". The service planned to operate under California's End of Life Option Act. Nectome won an $80,000 Brain Preservation Foundation prize for preserving a pig's brain at the synaptic level, and received a $960,000 federal grant from the National Institute of Mental Health. Nectome collaborated with MIT neuroscientist Edward Boyden.

=== Nanobots ===
One approach to digital immortality is gradually "replacing" neurons in the brain with advanced medical technology such as nanobiotechnology, possibly using wetware computer technology or using nanobots to read brain structure, as described by Alexey Turchin.

== Issues ==
=== Philosophical issues ===
The main philosophical problem faced by mind uploading is the hard problem of consciousness: the difficulty of explaining how a physical entity such as a human can have qualia, phenomenal consciousness, or subjective experience. Many philosophical responses to the hard problem entail that mind uploading is fundamentally impossible, while others are compatible with mind uploading. Many proponents of mind uploading defend its feasibility by recourse to non-reductive physicalism, which includes the belief that consciousness is an emergent feature that arises from large neural network high-level patterns of organization that could be realized in other processing devices. Mind uploading relies on the idea that the human mind reduces to neural network paths and the weights of synapses in the brain. In contrast, many dualistic and idealistic accounts seek to avoid the hard problem of consciousness by explaining it in terms of immaterial (and presumably inaccessible) substances, which pose a fundamental challenge to the feasibility of artificial consciousness in general.

Assuming physicalism is true, the mind can be defined as the information state of the brain, so it exists only in the same sense as the information content of a data file or a computer software state. In this case, data specifying a neural network's information state could be captured and copied as a "computer file" from the brain and implemented in a different physical form. This is not to deny that minds are richly adapted to their substrates. An analogy to mind uploading is copying the information state of a computer program from the memory of the computer on which it is running to another computer and then continuing its execution on the second computer. The second computer may have different hardware architecture, but it emulates the hardware of the first computer.

These philosophical issues have a long history. In 1775, Thomas Reid wrote: "I would be glad to know... whether when my brain has lost its original structure, and when some hundred years after the same materials are fabricated so curiously as to become an intelligent being, whether, I say that being will be me; or, if, two or three such beings should be formed out of my brain; whether they will all be me, and consequently one and the same intelligent being." Although the term hard problem of consciousness was coined in 1994, debate about the issue is ancient. Augustine of Hippo argued against physicalist "Academians" in the 5th century, writing that consciousness cannot be an illusion because only a conscious being can be deceived or experience an illusion. René Descartes, the founder of mind-body dualism, made a similar objection in the 17th century, coining the popular phrase "Je pense, donc je suis" ("I think, therefore I am"). Although physicalism was proposed in ancient times, Thomas Huxley was among the first to describe mental experience as merely an epiphenomenon of interactions within the brain, with no causal power of its own and entirely downstream from brain activity.

Many transhumanists and singularitarians hope to become immortal by creating one or many non-biological functional copies of their brains, thereby leaving their "biological shell". But the philosopher and transhumanist Susan Schneider claims that, at best, uploading would create a copy of the original mind. Schneider agrees that consciousness has a computational basis, but does not agree that this means a person survives uploading. According to her, uploading would probably result in the death of one's brain, and only others could maintain the illusion that the original person survived. It is implausible to think that one's consciousness could leave one's brain for another location; ordinary physical objects do not behave this way. Ordinary objects (rocks, tables, etc.) are not simultaneously here and elsewhere. At best, a copy is created.

Others have argued against such conclusions. For example, Buddhist transhumanist James Hughes has pointed out that this consideration only goes so far: if one believes the self is an illusion, worries about survival are not reasons to avoid uploading, and Keith Wiley has presented an argument wherein all resulting minds of an uploading procedure have equal claims to the original identity, such that survival of the self is determined retroactively from a strictly subjective position. Some have also asserted that consciousness is a part of an extra-biological system yet to be discovered and therefore cannot yet be fully understood. Without transference of consciousness, true uploading or perpetual immortality cannot be practically achieved.

Another potential consequence of mind uploading is that the decision to upload may create a mindless symbol manipulator instead of a conscious mind (a philosophical zombie). If a computer could process sensory inputs to generate the same outputs that a human mind does (speech, muscle movements, etc.) without having conscious experience, it may be impossible to determine whether the uploaded mind is conscious and not merely an automaton that behaves like a conscious being. Thought experiments like the Chinese room raise fundamental questions about mind uploading: if an upload behaves in ways highly indicative of consciousness, or insists that it is conscious, is it conscious? There might also be an absolute upper limit in processing speed above which consciousness cannot be sustained. The subjectivity of consciousness precludes a definitive answer to this question.

Many scientists, including Ray Kurzweil, believe that whether a separate entity is conscious is impossible to know with confidence, since consciousness is inherently subjective (see solipsism). Regardless, some scientists believe consciousness is the consequence of substrate-neutral computational processes. Other scientists, including Roger Penrose, believe consciousness may emerge from some form of quantum computation that depends on an organic substrate (see quantum mind).

In light of uncertainty about whether uploaded minds are conscious, Sandberg proposes a cautious approach:

Principle of assuming the most (PAM): Assume that any emulated system could have the same mental properties as the original system and treat it correspondingly.

==== Continuity of consciousness ====
Michael Cerullo's theory of consciousness is called "psychological branching identity". He argues a person would survive gradual destructive uploading via scan-and-copy (or copy-and-delete), based on a theory grounded in emergent materialism, functionalism, and psychological continuity theory. According to him, psychological identity branches out, with each copy an authentic continuation of the original, ensuring the persistence of the original consciousness even if the substrate is destroyed in the process. The mind branches into distinct paths, all of which are continuations of the uploaded person.

=== Ethical and legal implications ===
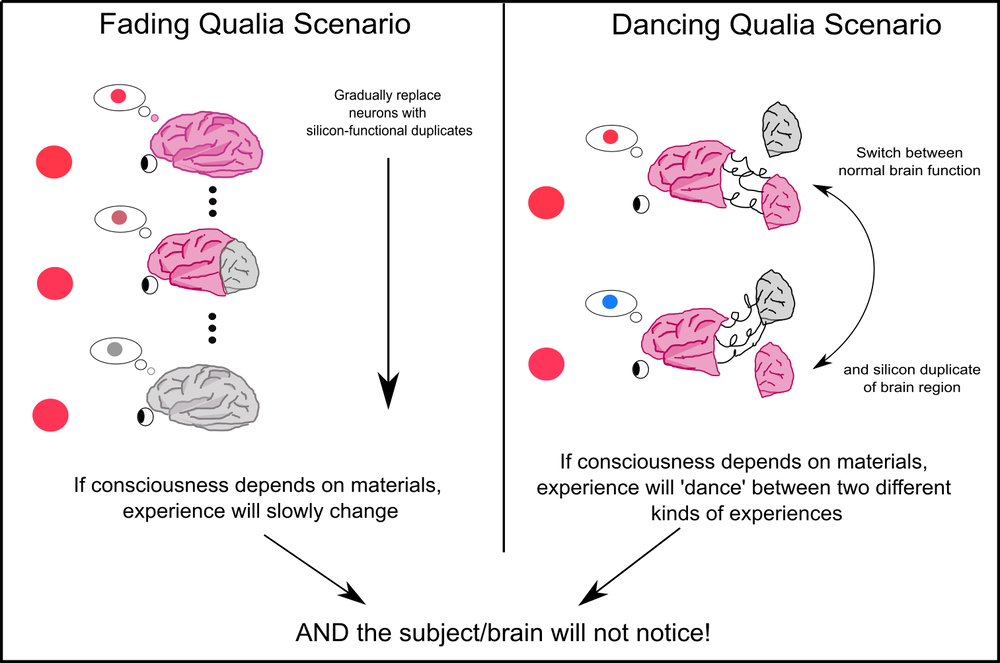
The "fading qualia" and "dancing qualia" thought experiments proposed by Chalmers

The process of developing emulation technology raises ethical issues related to animal welfare and artificial consciousness. The neuroscience required to develop brain emulation would require animal experimentation, first on invertebrates and then on small mammals before moving on to humans. Sometimes the animals would just need to be euthanized in order to extract, slice, and scan their brains, but sometimes behavioral and in vivo measures would be required, which might cause pain to living animals.

In addition, the resulting animal emulations might suffer, depending on one's views about consciousness. Bancroft argues for the plausibility of consciousness in brain simulations based on David Chalmers's "fading qualia" thought experiment. Bancroft concludes: "If, as I argue above, a sufficiently detailed computational simulation of the brain is potentially operationally equivalent to an organic brain, it follows that we must consider extending protections against suffering to simulations." Chalmers has argued that such virtual realities would be genuine realities. But if mind uploading occurs and the uploads are not conscious, there may be a significant opportunity cost. In Superintelligence, Nick Bostrom expresses concern that a "Disneyland without children" could be built.

It might help reduce emulation suffering to develop virtual equivalents of anesthesia and to omit processing related to pain and/or consciousness. But some experiments might require a fully functioning and suffering animal emulation. Animals might also suffer by accident due to flaws and lack of insight into what parts of their brains are suffering. Questions also arise about the moral status of partial brain emulations and about creating neuromorphic emulations inspired by biological brains but differently built.

Brain emulations could be erased by computer viruses or malware without destroying the underlying hardware. This may make assassination easier than for physical humans. The attacker might take the computing power for its own use.

Many questions arise regarding the legal personhood of emulations. Would they be given the rights of biological humans? If a person makes an emulated copy of themselves and then dies, does the emulation inherit their property and official positions? Could the emulation ask to "pull the plug" when its biological version was terminally ill or in a coma? Would it help to treat emulations as adolescents for a few years so that the biological creator would maintain temporary control? Would criminal emulations receive the death penalty, or would they be given forced data modification as a form of "rehabilitation"? Could an upload have marriage and child-care rights?

If simulated minds had rights, it might be difficult to ensure their protection. For example, social science researchers might be tempted to secretly expose simulated minds, or whole isolated societies of simulated minds, to controlled experiments in which many copies of the same minds are exposed (serially or simultaneously) to different test conditions.

==== Public attitudes ====
Research on public attitudes toward mind uploading reveals complex psychological factors. A 2018 study by Michael Laakasuo found that approval or disapproval of mind uploading technology is significantly predicted by individual differences in disgust sensitivity, particularly sexual disgust and purity moral orientations, rather than rational thinking styles or personality traits. The research found that:

- People with higher "purity" moral foundations (from Moral Foundations Theory) were more likely to condemn mind upload technology
- Science fiction familiarity strongly predicted approval of mind uploading
- Those with death anxiety were more accepting of mind uploading, viewing it as life extension rather than death
- The target platform (computer, android, artificial brain) did not affect moral judgments—only the act of transfer itself mattered

The study suggests mind uploading may have broader appeal than previously thought among those seeking life extension or immortality.

Another study by Laakasuo found that attitudes toward mind uploading are predicted by belief in an afterlife; the existence of mind uploading technology may threaten religious and spiritual notions of immortality and divinity.

=== Political and economic implications ===
Emulations might be preceded by a technological arms race driven by first-strike advantages. Their emergence and existence may lead to increased risk of war, including inequality, power struggles, strong loyalty and willingness to die among emulations, and new forms of racism, xenophobia, and religious prejudice. If emulations run much faster than humans, there might not be enough time for human leaders to make wise decisions or negotiate. Humans might react violently to the growing power of emulations, especially if it reduces human wages. Emulations might not trust each other, and even well-intentioned defensive measures might be interpreted as offense.

Robin Hanson's book The Age of Em poses many hypotheses on the nature of a society of mind uploads, including that the most common minds would be copies of adults with personalities conducive to long hours of productive specialized work.

=== Emulation timelines and AI risk ===
Kenneth D. Miller, a professor of neuroscience at Columbia University and a co-director of the Center for Theoretical Neuroscience, has raised doubts about the practicality of mind uploading. His major argument is that reconstructing neurons and their connections is itself a formidable task, but far from sufficient. The brain's operation depends on the dynamics of electrical and biochemical signal exchange between neurons, so capturing them in a single "frozen" state may be insufficient. In addition, the nature of these signals may require modeling at the molecular level and beyond. Therefore, while not rejecting the idea in principle, Miller believes that the complexity of the "absolute" duplication of a mind will be insurmountable for several hundred years.

The neuroscience and computer-hardware technologies that may make brain emulation possible are widely desired for other reasons, and their development will presumably continue. People may also have brain emulations for a brief but significant period on the way to non-emulation-based human-level AI. If emulation technology arrives, it is debatable whether its advance should be accelerated or slowed.

Arguments for speeding up brain-emulation research:

- If neuroscience rather than computing power is the bottleneck to brain emulation, emulation advances may be more erratic and unpredictable based on when new scientific discoveries happen. Limited computing power would mean the first emulations would run slower and so would be easier to adapt to, and there would be more time for the technology to transition through society.
- Improvements in manufacturing, 3D printing, and nanotechnology may accelerate hardware production, which could increase the "computing overhang" from excess hardware relative to neuroscience.
- If one AI-development group had a lead in emulation technology, it would have more subjective time to win an arms race to build the first superhuman AI. Because it would be less rushed, it would have more freedom to consider AI risks.

Arguments for slowing brain-emulation research:

- Greater investment in brain emulation and associated cognitive science might enhance AI researchers' ability to create "neuromorphic" (brain-inspired) algorithms, such as neural networks, reinforcement learning, and hierarchical perception. This could accelerate risks from uncontrolled AI. Participants at a 2011 AI workshop estimated an 85% probability that neuromorphic AI would arrive before brain emulation. This was based on the idea that brain emulation would require understanding of the workings and functions of the brain's components, along with the technological know-how to emulate neurons. But reverse-engineering the Microsoft Windows code base is already hard, and reverse-engineering the brain is likely much harder. By a very narrow margin, the participants leaned toward the view that accelerating brain emulation would increase expected AI risk.
- Waiting might give society more time to think about the consequences of brain emulation and develop institutions to improve cooperation.

Emulation research would also accelerate neuroscience as a whole, which might accelerate medical advances, cognitive enhancement, lie detectors, and psychological manipulation.

Emulations might be easier to control than de novo AI because:

1. Human abilities, behavioral tendencies, and vulnerabilities are more thoroughly understood, thus control measures might be more intuitive and easier to plan.
2. Emulations could more easily inherit human motivations.
3. Emulations are harder to manipulate than de novo AI, because brains are messy and complicated; this could reduce risks of their rapid takeoff. Also, emulations may be bulkier and require more hardware than AI, which would also slow the speed of a transition. Unlike AI, an emulation would not be able to rapidly expand beyond the size of a human brain. Emulations running at digital speeds would have less intelligence differential vis-à-vis AI and so might more easily control AI.

As counterpoint to these considerations, Bostrom notes some downsides:

1. Even if human behavior is better understood, the evolution of emulation behavior under self-improvement might be much less predictable than the evolution of safe de novo AI under self-improvement.
2. Emulations may not inherit all human motivations. Perhaps they would inherit people's darker motivations or would behave abnormally in the unfamiliar environment of cyberspace.
3. Even if there is a slow takeoff toward emulations, there would still be a second transition to de novo AI later. Two intelligence explosions may mean more total risk.

Because of the postulated difficulties that a whole brain emulation-generated superintelligence would pose for the control problem, computer scientist Stuart J. Russell, in his book Human Compatible, rejects creating one, calling it "so obviously a bad idea".

== Advocates ==
In 1979, Hans Moravec described and endorsed mind uploading using a brain surgeon. He used a similar description in 1988, calling it "transmigration".

Ray Kurzweil, director of engineering at Google, has long predicted that people will be able to upload their brains to computers and become "digitally immortal" by 2045. For example, he made this claim in his 2013 speech at the Global Futures 2045 International Congress in New York, which claims to subscribe to a similar set of beliefs. Mind uploading has also been advocated by a number of researchers in neuroscience and artificial intelligence, such as Marvin Minsky. In 1993, Joe Strout created a small website called the Mind Uploading Home Page, and began advocating the idea in cryonics circles and elsewhere. That site has not been updated since 2006, but it has spawned other sites, including MindUploading.org, run by Randal A. Koene, who also moderates a mailing list on the topic. These advocates see mind uploading as a medical procedure that could save countless lives.

Many transhumanists look forward to the development and deployment of mind-uploading technology, with transhumanists such as Nick Bostrom predicting that it will become possible within the 21st century due to technological trends such as Moore's law.

Michio Kaku, in collaboration with Science, hosted the documentary Sci Fi Science: Physics of the Impossible, based on his book Physics of the Impossible. Episode four, "How to Teleport", mentions that mind uploading via techniques such as quantum entanglement and whole-brain emulation using an advanced MRI machine may enable people to be transported vast distances at near light-speed.

Gregory S. Paul's and Earl D. Cox's book Beyond Humanity: CyberEvolution and Future Minds is about the eventual (and, to the authors, almost inevitable) evolution of computers into sentient beings, but also deals with human mind transfer. Richard Doyle's Wetwares: Experiments in PostVital Living deals extensively with uploading from the perspective of distributed embodiment, arguing for example that humans are part of the "artificial life phenotype". Doyle's vision reverses the polarity on uploading, with artificial life forms such as uploads actively seeking out biological embodiment as part of their reproductive strategy.

== In fiction ==
Mind uploading—transferring one's personality to a computer—appears in several works of science fiction. It is distinct from transferring a consciousness from one human body to another. It is sometimes applied to a single person and sometimes to an entire society. Recurring themes in these stories include whether the computerized mind is truly conscious, and if so, whether identity is preserved. It is a common feature of the cyberpunk subgenre, sometimes taking the form of digital immortality.

== See also ==
- Artificial brain
- Artificial consciousness
- Body swap
- BRAIN Initiative
- Brain simulation
- Brain transplant
- Brain-reading
- Chinese room
- Cyborg
- Cylon (reimagining)
- Connectome
- Democratic transhumanism
- Diaspora (novel)
- Dmitry Itskov
- Human Brain Project
- Hypothetical technology
- Isolated brain
- Miguel Nicolelis
- Neural network (machine learning)
- Neural network software
- Neuralink
- Open individualism
- Pantheon (TV series)
- Posthumanization
- Ship of Theseus
- Simulation hypothesis
- Soma (video game)
- Technologically enabled telepathy
- Teletransportation paradox
- Thought recording and reproduction device
- Turing test
- The Amazing Digital Circus
- The Future of Work and Death
- Vertiginous question
- 2045 Initiative
