= American Federation for Aging Research =

US non-profit organization

The American Federation for Aging Research (AFAR) is a private, charitable, 501(c)(3), organization whose mission is to provide funding for biomedical research on aging. It was founded in 1981.

The organization provided planning funding for the proposed Targeting Aging with Metformin (TAME) clinical trial.
