= Lifeboat Foundation =

Existential risk reduction organization

- Formation: 2002; 24 years ago
- Founder: Eric Klien
- Founded at: Gardnerville, Nevada
- Type: Nonprofit organization
- Purpose: Prevention of existential risk
- Location: Gardnerville, Nevada
- Website: www.lifeboat.com

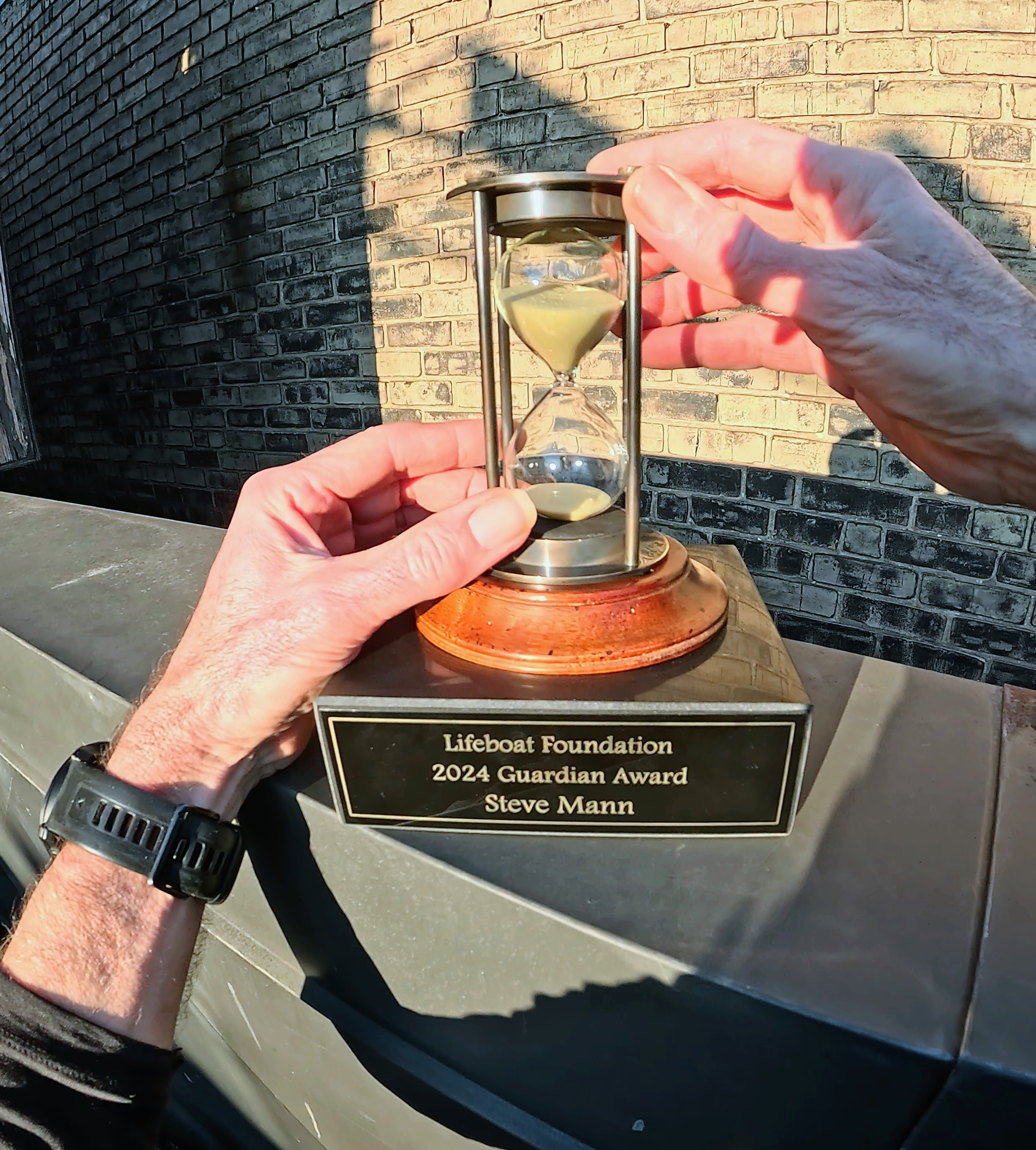
The Lifeboat Foundation Guardian Award takes the form of an hourglass trophy as pictured, 2024

The Lifeboat Foundation is a nonprofit organization based in Gardnerville, Nevada, dedicated to the prevention of global catastrophic risk. Prominent scholars from Lifeboat Foundation's Advisory Board includes 1986 Nobel Laureate in Literature Wole Soyinka, 1993 Nobel Laureate in Medicine Richard J. Roberts, 2002 Nobel Laureate in Economic Sciences Daniel Kahneman, and 2007 Nobel Laureate in Economic Sciences Eric Maskin.

In 2007, founder Eric Klien guest-blogged on Pamela Geller's "Atlas Shrugs" blog, describing the foundation's purpose as being to "develop enough resources" to save "at least SOME people" from what he called a "Religion of Science" that, because of "the Law of Accelerating Returns," "will soon go from a religion with the potential to commit mass human sacrifice to one that DOES have such a potential."

Asserting that "[n]o [extraterrestrial] civilization has survived the Religion of Science so far," Klien went on to argue that the Leslie-Carter Doomsday argument leads to the conclusion that Earth must currently host the most technologically advanced civilization that humanity can possibly know about. Klien concluded his essay with a call to develop "self-sustaining colonies in space and elsewhere", and with a summary of his strategy for financing such safe harbors:

I have developed Lifeboat Foundation with a Trojan Horse meme that tries to wrap our goals in the Religion of Science memes. For example our mission statement begins with "The Lifeboat Foundation is a nonprofit nongovernmental organization dedicated to encouraging scientific advancements". By wrapping our meme with a Religion of Science coating, I hope to develop enough resources that we can make sure that unlike every civilization so far, we can have at least SOME people survive this dangerous religion.

== Organization ==
Lifeboat was founded by online dating service entrepreneur Eric Klien, who continues to run Lifeboat as president and chairman of the board of directors. The organization has raised over $500,000 in total donations from individuals and corporate matching funds programs, most of which went to "supporting conferences and publishing papers". Writer and advisory board member Sonia Arrison describes the group as "basically a Website, that raises money for various things".

In 2007, the Lifeboat Foundation absorbed an organization called the "Alliance to Rescue Civilization", which aimed to establish a disaster-proof record of human civilization on the Moon.

Lifeboat has tried to raise more money by accepting donations in Bitcoin, a cryptocurrency. According to Fast Company, Lifeboat raised $72,000 in Bitcoin donations and pledges, and sought to use Bitcoin to protect itself against events such as the 2012–13 Cypriot financial crisis.

The Board of Directors includes Eric Klien, Carl Martinez, Philippe van Nedervelde, Chris K. Haley, Sergio Tarrero.

== Activities ==
According to Fast Company, Lifeboat runs a number of "programs" to protect Earth against threats such as an asteroid impact, grey goo from molecular nanotechnology, and unfriendly artificial general intelligence. Lifeboat maintains a list of "dozens and dozens" of catastrophic threats - including the eventual burnout of the Sun — divided into four main categories of "calamities", "collapse", "dominium", and "betrayal". Journalist Ashlee Vance notes that it's "unclear how far along any of these projects is".

The Lifeboat Foundation also publishes books, such as Visions of the Future, an anthology of futurist and science fiction writing reviewed in the Financial Times.

Lifeboat Foundation presented the “Lifeboat to the Stars” award at the Campbell Conference. This award honored the best work of science fiction of any length published in the previous two years contributing to an understanding of the benefits, means, and difficulties of interstellar travel. Lifeboat Foundation also funded the launch of high altitude experiments for Teachers in Space.

== Advisory Boards ==
The Lifeboat Foundation maintains several advisory boards consisting of more than 3000 scientists, futurists, and public figures. These boards are organized by "existential risk" categories. According to the organization, they function as a think tank to develop strategies for safeguarding humanity.

Notable members of the foundation's advisory boards have included:

- Nobel Laureates: Richard J. Roberts (Medicine), Eric Maskin (Economics), and Wole Soyinka (Literature).
- Science and Technology: Jürgen Schmidhuber, Stephen Wolfram, Lee Cronin, Joscha Bach, Stuart Kauffman, Ray Kurzweil, Seth Shostak, Jill Tarter, Aubrey de Grey, Mustafa Suleyman, Richard Stallman, and Jaan Tallinn.
- Philosophy and Ethics: Nick Bostrom, Max More, Peter Singer and David Pearce.
- Public Figures and Authors: Buzz Aldrin, Carolyn Porco, Edward James Olmos, Robert J. Sawyer, and Douglas Rushkoff.

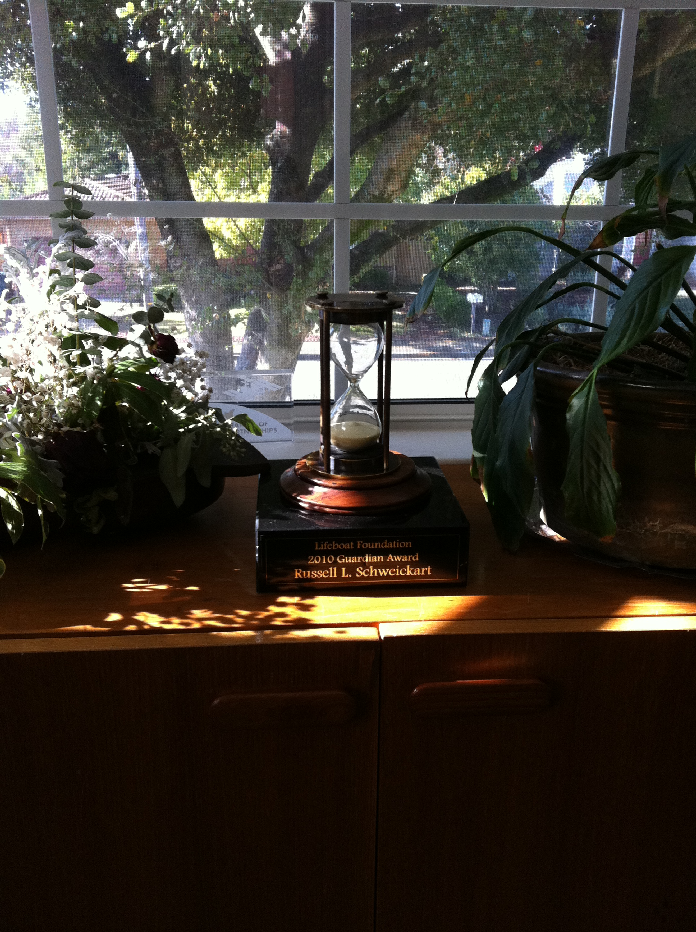
2010 Lifeboat Foundation Guardian Award in Apollo Astronaut Rusty Schweickart's Office

== Guardian Award ==
The Lifeboat Foundation awards the Guardian Award every year to a leading scientist who has contributed most to the saving of humanity from existential risks.

Recent award recipients include Steve Mann (2024), Geoffrey Hinton (2023), and Volodymyr Zelenskyy (2022).
