= Dmitry Itskov =

Russian billionaire entrepreneur

- Дмитрий Ицков
- Born: 1980 (age 45–46); Bryansk, RFSFR
- Occupation: Entrepreneur
- Known for: New Media Stars, 2045 Initiative

Dmitry Itskov (Russian: Дмитрий Ицков; born 1980) is a Russian entrepreneur, billionaire and the founder of New Media Stars (Russian: Ньюмедиа Старз, romanized: N'yumedia Starz, a web-based media company), and of the 2045 Initiative. He has made a reported £1bn from his Moscow-based news-publishing company.

== Biography ==
He was born in Bryansk. He graduated from Plekhanov Russian Academy of Economics.

Together with State Duma deputy Konstantin Rykov, he was involved in large-scale PR campaigns for United Russia.

== Career ==
In 2005, he created New Media Stars in Moscow.

In 2011, he set up 2045 Initiative, which aims to achieve cybernetic immortality by 2045.

In 2012, Itskov sent an open letter to the richest people in the world from the Forbes list with a request to join forces in the development of technologies that will prolong human life and make it immortal.

In May 2012, he and his colleagues demonstrated a humanoid robot (his own replica) at the initial stage of development.

On June 15 and 16, 2013, the Global Future 2045 conference was held in New York City. Global Future 2045 is founded by Itskov, its first meeting was in Moscow.

Itskov said, in a 2016 BBC Horizon TV documentary, that the "ultimate goal of [his] plan is to transfer someone’s personality into the new artificial carrier."

== Awards and honours ==
- Commendation from the President of the Russian Federation (December 16, 2009) – for active participation in the creation of the Internet documentary "War 08.08.08. The Art of betrayal"

== Personal life ==
His father Ilya Itskov directed musical theater and his mother was a schoolteacher.

== See also ==
- Transhumanism
- Mind uploading
