= 2045 Initiative =

Russian nonprofit organization

- Founded: February 2011; 15 years ago
- Founder: Dmitry Itskov
- Purpose: Life extension
- Location: Moscow, Russia
- Region served: Global
- Method: Avatar project
- Owner: Dmitry Itskov
- Key people: Dmitry Itskov (managing director)
- Website: www.2045.com

The 2045 Initiative is a nonprofit organization that develops a network and community of researchers in the field of life extension, focusing on combining brain emulation and robotics to create forms of cyborgs. It was founded by Russian entrepreneur Dmitry Itskov in February 2011 with the participation of Russian specialists in the field of neural interfaces, robotics, artificial organs and systems. Philippe van Nedervelde serves as the Director of International Development.

The main goal of the 2045 Initiative, as stated on its website, is "to create technologies enabling the transfer of an individual’s personality to a more advanced non-biological carrier, and extending life, including to the point of immortality. We devote particular attention to enabling the fullest possible dialogue between the world’s major spiritual traditions, science and society".

== Future prospects ==
The 2045 Initiative has a roadmap for developing cybernetic immortality. The Initiative has the goal for an avatar controlled by a "brain-computer" interface to be developed between 2015 and 2020, between 2020 and 2025 creating an autonomous life-support system for the human brain linked to a robot, between 2030 and 2035 creating a computer model of the brain and human consciousness with the means to transfer it into an artificial carrier, and by 2045 create a new era for humanity with holographic bodies.

== Avatar Project ==
One of the featured life-extension projects is to design an artificial humanoid body (called an "avatar") and an advanced brain–computer interface system. On the biological side, a life support system will be developed for hosting a human brain inside the avatar and maintaining it alive and functional. A later phase of the project will research into the creation of an artificial brain into which the original individual consciousness may be transferred.

=== Avatar A ===
A robotic copy of a human body remotely capable of interpreting commands directly from the mind and sending information back to the mind in a form that can be interpreted via brain–computer interface. It is estimated to be popularized in or before 2020. This, however, has failed to transpire.

=== Avatar B ===
An avatar in which a human brain is transplanted at the end of one's life. Avatar B has an autonomous system providing life support for the brain and allowing it interaction with the environment, possibly mounted into an existing Avatar A chassis. The deadline of this phase was the year 2025 and was also unmet.

=== Avatar C ===
An avatar with an artificial brain to which a human personality is transferred for emulation at the end of one's life. The first successful attempt to upload one's personality to a computer is estimated to happen around 2035.

=== Avatar D ===
A hologram- or diagram-like avatar. This is the ultimate goal of this project but is optional since, assuming either the upload is involuntary or all humans chose to upload, biological diseases are prevented in the previous phase, and it is far away from current technological achievement and our understanding on physics.

== Reception ==
Professor George M. Church has complained that "there's a lot of dots that aren't connected in (Itskov's) plans. It's not a real road map." Martine A. Rothblatt, the founder of United Therapeutics, has claimed the Avatar Project is "no more wild than in the early '60s, when we saw the advent of liver and kidney transplants."

== See also ==
- Brain transplant
- Cyborg
- Exocortex
- Human enhancement
- Isolated brain
- Mind uploading
- Transhumanism
