= Moscow State Aviation Technological University =

University in Moscow, Russia

Coordinates: 55.739178°N 37.409324°E

- Российский государственный технологический университет
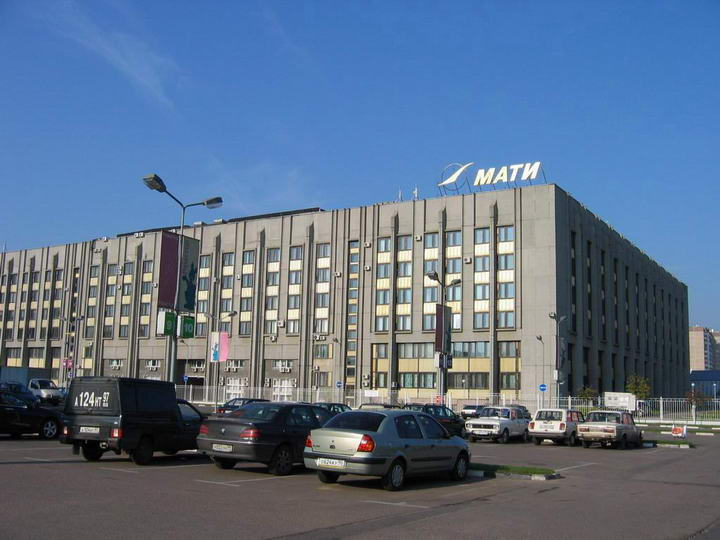
- Main building in Moscow
- Type: Public
- Established: 1932
- President: Artemy V. Nikitov
- Administrative staff: 1,218
- Undergraduates: 8,500
- Location: Moscow, Russia
- Website: http://www.mati.ru

Moscow State Aviation Technological University is a university in Moscow, Russia. The modern name of this university is «MATI» – Russian State University of Aviation Technology (Russian: Российский государственный технологический университет). It is named after the Russian aeronautics and rocketry pioneer Konstantin Eduardovich Tsiolkovsky. The current name of "MATI" Russian State Technological University is "MAI" Moscow Aviation Institute

== History ==
The university started in 1932 with the foundation of Dirigible Engineering Educational Center attached to Civil Air Fleet (CAF) Ministry by joining the Aircraft School of Leningrad Institute of CAF Engineers and Moscow Aviation Institute. In 1939 the center was reorganized into the Moscow Institute of CAF Engineers and named after K.E. Tsiolkovsky.

Konstantin Eduardovitch Tsiolkovsky (1857–1935) was Russian scientist and inventor in the field of aerodynamics, aerospace engineering and the theory of aircraft, rockets and dirigible. On June 17, 1940, the Moscow Institute of Aviation Technology (or MATI) was established. MATI attained the university status and name Moscow State Aviation Technology Institute – Russian State Technological University in 1992.

About 260 professors as well as more than 700 associate professors and Ph.D. scientists work at the university. The university provides training in 24 different areas of higher professional education and conducts research in 28 scientific fields. Additionally, it offers retraining opportunities for professionals from different industries and programs aimed at enhancing their skill levels.

Only in 1991 was MATI opened to foreign students. More than 200 students from Great Britain, the USA, Germany, South Korea, Turkey, India, Myanmar, Nepal, Kenya, Morocco, Oman, China, Iran, and some other countries are studying at the university. The university carries out a student and scientific exchange with the universities of the US, Great Britain, Taiwan, China, South Korea.

On the 31 March 2015 the Ministry of Education reorganized the Moscow Aviation Institute (MAI) by annexation of the Russian State Technological University named after Tsiolkovsky.

== Cooperation with Khrunichev State Research and Production Space Center ==
Cooperation of MATI and Khrunichev State Research and Production Space Center in the field of training of the specialists for aerospace industry, as well as scientific and research cooperation in development of new technology for space exploration has resulted in establishing MATI's branch at Khrunichev Space R&D Center. This MATI branch received the name "Aerospace University for Specialized Training". The main goal for establishing an aerospace university was training of the specialists in the field of development and production of advanced aerospace technology using for this aim teaching, scientific and production experience of MATI and Khrunichev Space R&D Center.

The main fields of MATI include the following:

- development of the educational programs for additional education in Aerospace Engineering;
- training of the technical staff (engineers, technicians, etc.);
- teaching of the foreign students according to the educational programs additional to the undergraduate, graduate and postgraduate programs in Aerospace Engineering

Short-term educational programs for foreign specialists from the aerospace industry (similar program MATI in cooperation with Khrunichev Space R&D Center is carrying on in the frame of the Russian-Britain Project for additional training of the students and specialists in aerospace technologies).

== University structure ==
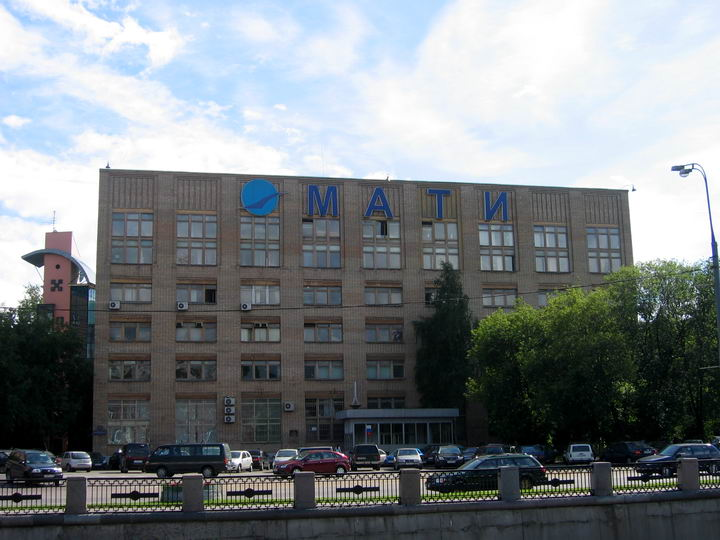
University building in Tagansky District

There are seven main faculties in the university:

- Faculty of Aerospace Technology
- Faculty of Aerospace Engineering and Technology
- Faculty of Avionics and Informational Systems
- Faculty of Material Science
- Faculty of Applied Mathematics, Mechanics and Computer Science
- Faculty of Economics and Ecology
- Faculty of Social Science

== University partners ==
- Airbus
- BAE Systems
- Royal Navy
- Kingston University
- K. N. Toosi University of Technology
- Delft University of Technology
- All-Russian Institute Of Aviation Materials
- Vnukovo Airport
- NPO Energomash
