= National Core for Neuroethics =

Canadian ethics institute

- National Core for Neuroethics logo
- Parent institution: UBC Faculty of Medicine
- Founders: Judy Illes, Peter Reiner
- Established: 2007
- Mission: Tackle the ethical, legal, policy and social implications of frontier neuroscience
- Focus: Neuroethics, Neurodegenerative Diseases, Regenerative Medicine, Personalized Medicine
- Location: Vancouver, British Columbia, Canada, Canada
- Coordinates: 49°15′40″N 123°07′28″W
- Interactive map of National Core for Neuroethics
- Website: neuroethics.med.ubc.ca

The National Core for Neuroethics at the University of British Columbia was established in August 2007, with support from the Canadian Institutes of Health Research, the Institute of Mental Health and Addiction, the Canada Foundation for Innovation, the British Columbia Knowledge Development Fund, the Canada Research Chairs program, the UBC Brain Research Centre and the UBC Institute of Mental Health. Co-founded by Judy Illes and Peter Reiner, the Core studies neuroethics, with particular focus on ethics in neurodegenerative disease and regenerative medicine, international and cross-cultural challenges in brain research, neuroimaging and ethics, the neuroethics of enhancement, and personalized medicine.

The Core's major research projects are focused on the use of drugs and devices for neuroenhancement, ethics in neurodegenerative disease and regenerative medicine research, brain research, neuroimaging in the private sector, and the ethics of personalized medicine, among others. Members of the Core also lead initiatives aside from their research projects.

Considerable attention has been given to the Core by both the scholarly and non-academic media, with the Core featured in The New York Times, the Vancouver Sun, on the Canwest Global Newshour, and in the journal Science, amongst others. As an effort to engage the public in neuroethics discussion, the Core has recently started an online blog.

== Mission ==
The National Core for Neuroethics strives to "tackle the ethical, legal, policy and social implications of frontier neuroscience through high impact research, education and outreach to ensure the close alignment of innovation and human values".

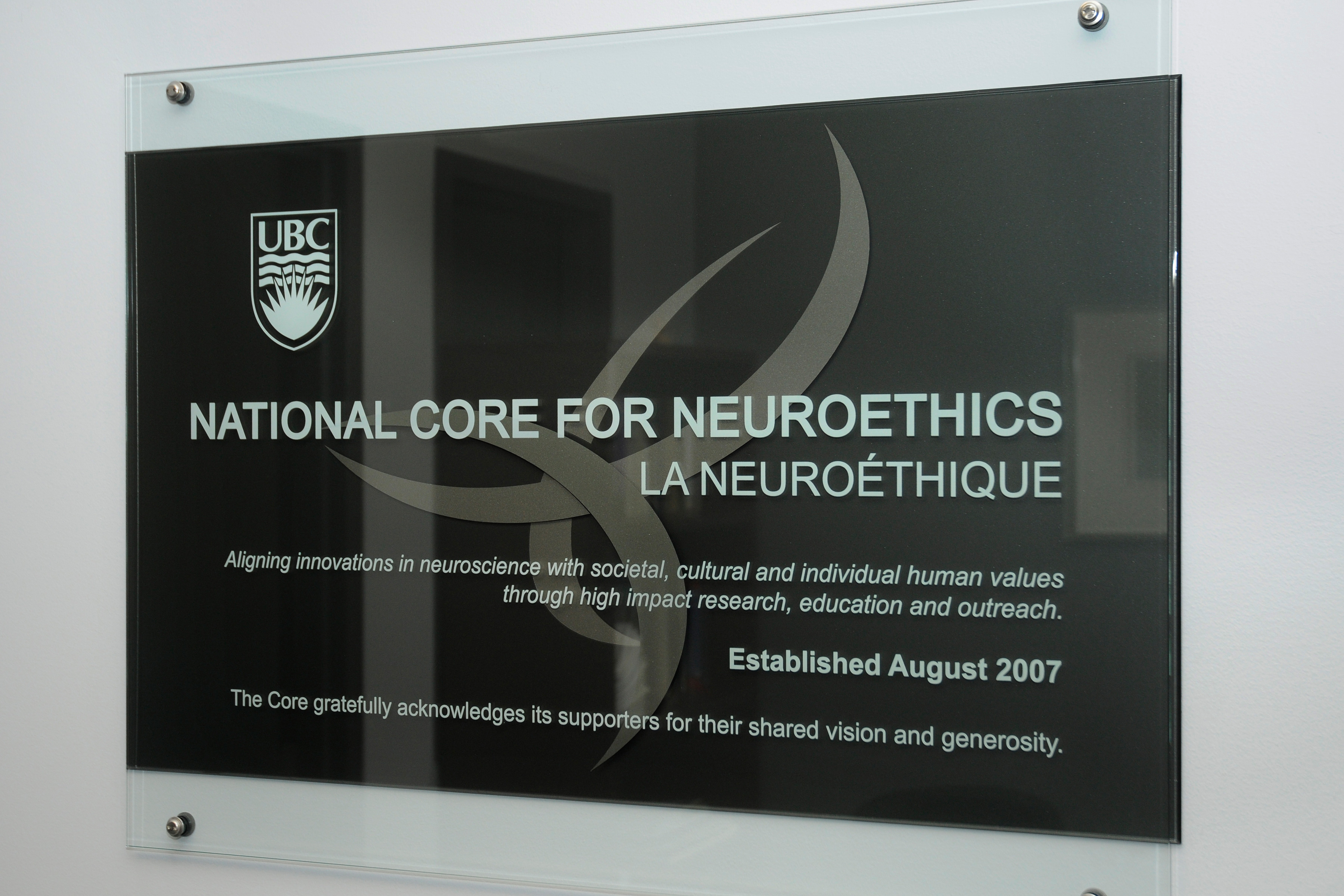
National Core for Neuroethics

== People ==
The Core is led by Judy Illes, PhD, Canada Research Chair in Neuroethics and Professor of Neurology at the University of British Columbia.

Peter Reiner, VMD, PhD, Professor of Psychiatry at the University of British Columbia, is a Senior Faculty Member with the Core.

== Funding ==
National Core for Neuroethics Inauguration

The Core receives financial support from the Canadian Institutes of Health Research, Institute of Mental Health and Addiction, Canada Foundation for Innovation, the British Columbia Knowledge Development Fund, the Canada Research Chairs program, the UBC Brain Research Centre, the UBC Institute of Mental Health, the National Institutes of Health, the Vancouver Coastal Health Research Institute, the British Columbia Rural and Remote Health Research Network, the Harvard NeuroDiscovery Center's Foundation for Ethics and Biotechnology, the North Growth Foundation, the Greenwall Foundation, the Stem Cell Network, the Dana Foundation, the Canadian Dementia Knowledge Translation Network, and Imperial Oil.

== Inauguration ==
In September 2008, the Core celebrated its first anniversary with an inauguration celebration held at the Chan Centre for the Performing Arts at the University of British Columbia. In attendance were international dignitaries in the field of neuroethics, including Joseph Fins (Chief of the Division of Medical Ethics at Weill Cornell Medical College), Dr. Barbara Sahakian (Professor of Clinical Neuropsychology at the Department of Psychiatry, University of Cambridge School of Clinical Medicine), Eric Racine (Director, Neuroethics Research Unit, Institut de recherches cliniques de Montréal), and Dr. Rémi Quirion (Scientific Director, Institute of Neurosciences, Mental Health and Addiction (INMHA)).
