= Elizabeth Wurtzel =

American writer and journalist (1967–2020)

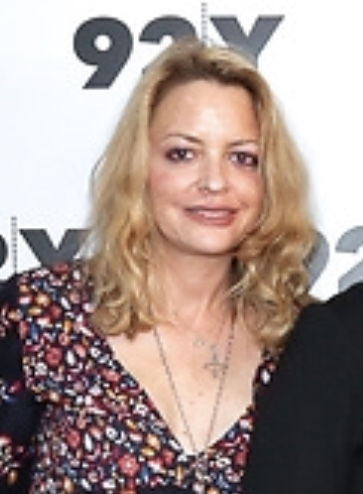
- Wurtzel in 2018
- Born: Elizabeth Lee Wurtzel; July 31, 1967; New York City, New York, U.S.
- Died: January 7, 2020 (aged 52); New York City, New York, U.S.
- Education: Harvard University (BA); Yale University (JD)
- Occupations: Author; journalist; lawyer
- Spouse: James Freed (m. 2015)
- Writing career
- Years active: 1980s–2020
- Genre: Confessional memoir
- Notable work: Prozac Nation

Elizabeth Lee Wurtzel (July 31, 1967 – January 7, 2020) was an American writer, journalist, and lawyer known for the confessional memoir Prozac Nation, which she published at the age of 27. Her work often focused on chronicling her personal struggles with depression, addiction, career, and relationships. Wurtzel's work drove a boom in confessional writing and the personal memoir genre during the 1990s, and she was viewed as a voice of Generation X. In her later life, Wurtzel worked briefly as an attorney before her death from breast cancer.

== Early life ==
Wurtzel grew up in a Jewish family on the Upper West Side of New York City and attended the Ramaz School. Her parents, Lynne Winters and Donald Wurtzel, divorced when she was young, and Wurtzel was primarily raised by her mother, who worked in publishing and as a media consultant. In a 2018 article in The Cut, Wurtzel wrote that she discovered in 2016 that her biological father was photographer Bob Adelman, who had worked with her mother in the 1960s.

As described in her memoir Prozac Nation, Wurtzel's depression began between the ages of 10 and 12. Wurtzel admitted to cutting herself when she was in adolescence, and of spending her teenage years in an environment of emotional angst, substance misuse, bad relationships, and frequent fights with family members. A gifted student with family wealth, Wurtzel went on to attend Harvard College, where she continued to struggle with depression and substance abuse.

== Early career ==
While an undergraduate at Harvard in the late 1980s, Wurtzel wrote for The Harvard Crimson and received the 1986 Rolling Stone College Journalism Award for a piece about Lou Reed. She also interned at The Dallas Morning News, but was fired after being accused of plagiarism. She received a B.A. degree in comparative literature from Harvard in 1989.

Wurtzel subsequently moved to Greenwich Village in New York City and found work as a pop music critic for The New Yorker and New York Magazine. The New York Times book critic Ken Tucker characterized her contributions to the former publication as "unintentionally hilarious." In 1997 Dwight Garner wrote in Salon.com that her column "was so roundly despised that I sometimes felt like its only friend in the world."

== Prozac Nation ==
Wurtzel was best known for her best-selling memoir Prozac Nation (1994), published when she was 27. The book chronicles her battle with depression as a college undergraduate and her eventual treatment with the medication Prozac. Michiko Kakutani wrote in The New York Times, "Wrenching and comical, self-indulgent and self-aware, Prozac Nation possesses the raw candor of Joan Didion's essays, the irritating emotional exhibitionism of Sylvia Plath's The Bell Jar, and the wry, dark humor of a Bob Dylan song." The paperback was a New York Times bestseller. The film adaptation, which starred Christina Ricci, premiered at the Toronto International Film Festival on September 8, 2001. The book is credited with launching the feminist disability memoir genre and with it Wurtzel was said to become "one of the first memoirists to write honestly and brutally about depression and addiction."

== Bitch ==
Wurtzel's next book was titled Bitch: In Praise of Difficult Women (1998). In The New York Times, Karen Lehrman wrote that while Bitch "is full of enormous contradictions, bizarre digressions and illogical outbursts, it is also one of the more honest, insightful and witty books on the subject of women to have come along in a while."

== More, Now, Again ==
More, Now, Again (2001), was the follow-up memoir to Prozac Nation and centered primarily on her addictions to cocaine and Ritalin. The book discusses her drug induced obsession with tweezing as a form of self-harm, and recounts her behavior while writing Bitch, among other subjects. It received generally negative reviews. In The Guardian, Toby Young wrote that "Wurtzel's overweening self-regard oozes from every sentence" and concluded, "In a sense, More, Now, Again is the reductio ad absurdum of this whole self-obsessed genre: it's a confessional memoir by someone who has nothing to confess. Wurtzel has nothing to declare apart from her self-adoration. A better title for it would be Me, Myself, I."

== Law school ==
In 2004, Wurtzel applied to Yale Law School. She later wrote that she never intended to pursue a career as a lawyer, but rather had simply wanted to attend law school. She was accepted at Yale even though "Her combined LSAT score of 160 was, as she put it, 'adequately bad' ... 'Suffice it to say I was admitted for other reasons,' Wurtzel said. 'My books, my accomplishments.'" She was a summer associate at Wilmer Cutler Pickering Hale and Dorr. She received her J.D. in 2008, but failed the New York state bar exam on her first attempt.

The legal community criticized Wurtzel for holding herself out as a lawyer in interviews, because she was not licensed to practice law in any jurisdiction at the time. Wurtzel passed the February 2010 New York State bar exam, and was employed full-time at Boies, Schiller & Flexner in New York City from 2008 to 2012. She continued to work for the firm as a case manager and on special projects. In July 2010, she wrote in the Brennan Center for Justice blog to make a proposal for the abolition of bar exams.

== Writing career ==
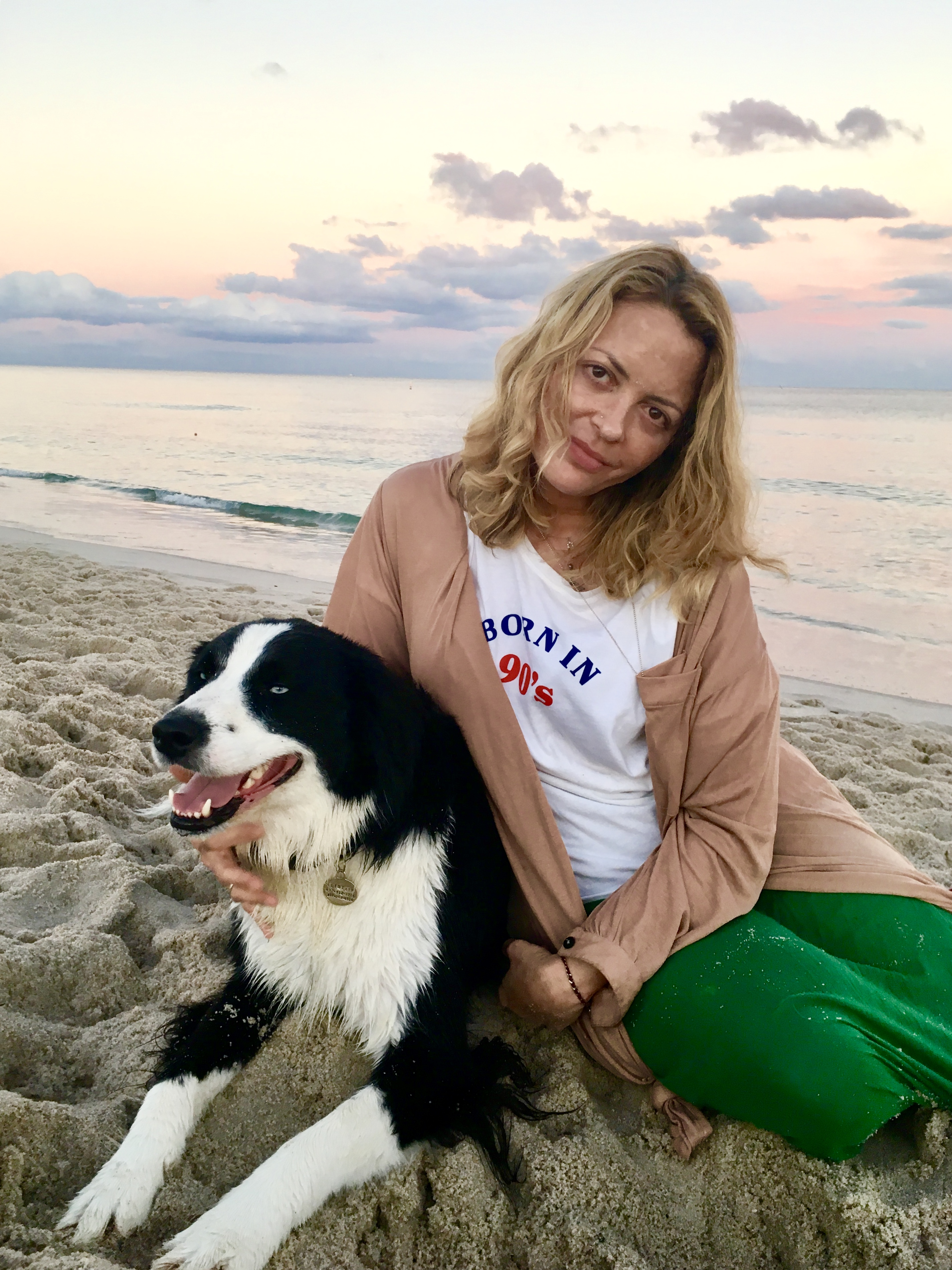
Wurtzel in 2017

While an intern at the Dallas Morning News, Wurtzel was fired, reportedly for plagiarism, although a 2002 The New York Times interview suggested that she had fabricated quotations in an article that was never published.

Wurtzel wrote regularly for The Wall Street Journal.

On September 21, 2008, after the suicide of writer David Foster Wallace, Wurtzel wrote an article for New York magazine about the time she had spent with him. She acknowledged that "I never knew David well."

In January 2009, she wrote an article for The Guardian, arguing that the vehemence of opposition demonstrated in Europe to Israel's actions in the 2008–2009 Israel–Gaza conflict, when compared to the international reaction to human rights abuses in the People's Republic of China, Darfur, and Arab countries, suggested an antisemitic undercurrent fueling the outrage.

In 2009, Wurtzel published an article in Elle magazine about societal pressures related to aging. Regretting her youth of casual sex and drug-taking, and realizing that she was not as beautiful as she once had been, she reflected that "whoever said youth is wasted on the young actually got it wrong; it's more that maturity is wasted on the old."

Wurtzel's publisher, Penguin, sued her in September 2012 in an effort to reclaim a $100,000 advance for a 2003 book contract for "a book for teenagers to help them cope with depression" that Wurtzel failed to complete. Of the $100,000, Penguin advanced Wurtzel $33,000 and sought interest of $7,500, claiming to have suffered detriment at Wurtzel's expense. The case was dismissed with prejudice in 2013.

In early 2013, Wurtzel published a New York magazine article lamenting the unconventional choices she had made in life, including heroin use and spending much of a lucrative publisher advance on a costly Birkin bag, and her failure to marry, have children, buy a house, save money or invest for retirement. "At long last, I had found myself vulnerable to the worst of New York City, because at 44 my life was not so different from the way it was at 24," she wrote. The article was widely criticized. In Slate, Amanda Marcotte called the piece Wurtzel's "latest word dump" and remarked that it was "as lengthy as it is incoherent."

Writing in The New Republic, Noreen Malone said of the piece that "Wurtzel wants us to know that she's a mess, and kindly invites us to rubberneck." Prachi Gupta for Salon characterized the essay as "rambling" and "self-involved." In The New Yorker, Meghan Daum called the piece "self-aggrandizing, disjointed, and, in its most egregious moments, leaves the impression that her editors might have been egging her on—or worse, taking advantage of what sometimes looks like a fairly precarious psychological state—in order to ensure maximum blogospheric outrage." By contrast, in The New Yorker Jia Tolentino called the piece "one of the best things she ever wrote."

In January 2015, Wurtzel published a short book titled Creatocracy under Thought Catalog's publishing imprint, TC Books. It is based on the thesis she wrote about intellectual property law upon graduation from Yale Law school.

== Personal life ==
Wurtzel met photo editor and aspiring novelist James Freed Jr. in October 2013 at an addiction-themed reading. They became engaged in September 2014 and married in May 2015, while she was undergoing therapy. The couple later separated, but remained close. They completed their divorce papers, but never filed them; they were still married when she died.

=== Illness and death ===
In February 2015, Wurtzel announced she had breast cancer, "which like many things that happen to women is mostly a pain in the ass. But compared with being 26 and crazy and waiting for some guy to call, it's not so bad. If I can handle 39 breakups in 21 days, I can get through cancer." She said of her double mastectomy and reconstruction, "It is quite amazing. They do both at the same time. You go in with breast cancer and come out with stripper boobs."

Wurtzel died in Manhattan from leptomeningeal disease as a complication of metastasized breast cancer on January 7, 2020, at age 52.

Her personal effects were sold at auction two years later.

== Bibliography ==
- Prozac Nation: Young and Depressed in America: A Memoir (1994), ISBN 0704302489
- Bitch: In Praise of Difficult Women (1998), ISBN 0704381079
- More, Now, Again: A Memoir of Addiction (2001), ISBN 0743226003
- The Secret of Life: Commonsense Advice for Uncommon Women (2004) (previously published as Radical Sanity and The Bitch Rules), ISBN 0307417387
- Creatocracy: How the Constitution Invented Hollywood (2015), ISBN 1576877701
