= Prozac Nation =

Memoir by Elizabeth Wurtzel

- Author: Elizabeth Wurtzel
- Language: English
- Genre: Memoir
- Publisher: Riverhead Trade
- Publication date: 1994
- Publication place: United States
- Pages: 384 pages
- ISBN: 978-1-573-22512-0 first edition

Prozac Nation is a memoir by American writer Elizabeth Wurtzel published in 1994. The book describes the author's experiences with atypical depression, her own character failings and how she managed to live through particularly difficult periods while completing college and working as a writer. Prozac is a trade name for the antidepressant fluoxetine. Wurtzel originally titled the book I Hate Myself and I Want To Die but her editor convinced her otherwise. It ultimately carried the subtitle Young and Depressed in America: A Memoir.

The book was adapted into a feature film, Prozac Nation (2001), starring Christina Ricci.

== Reception ==
Reviews were mixed. In The New York Times, Michiko Kakutani characterized Prozac Nation as "by turns wrenching and comical, self-indulgent and self-aware," comparing it with the "raw candor of Joan Didion's essays, the irritating emotional exhibitionism of Sylvia Plath's The Bell Jar and the wry, dark humor of a Bob Dylan song." While praising Wurtzel's prose style as "sparkling" and "luminescent," Kakutani thought the memoir "would have benefited enormously from some strict editing" and said that its "self-pitying passages make the reader want to shake the author, and remind her that there are far worse fates than growing up during the '70s in New York and going to Harvard." Publishers Weekly was ambivalent: "By turns emotionally powerful and tiresomely solipsistic, [Wurtzel's] book straddles the line between an absorbing self-portrait and a coy bid for public attention."

Writing in New York Magazine, Walter Kirn found that although Prozac Nation had "moments of shapely truth-telling," altogether it was "almost unbearable" and "a work of singular self-absorption." Calling the book a "tedious and poorly written story of Wurtzel's melodramatic life, warts and all (actually all warts)," Erica L. Werner asked in The Harvard Crimson, "How did this chick get a book contract in the first place? Why was she allowed to write such crap?" Werner also described Prozac Nation as "obscenely exhibitionistic," with "no purpose other than alternately to bore us and make us squirm." She said that the author "comes off as an irritating, solipsistic brat."

"It would be possible to have more sympathy for Ms. Wurtzel if she weren't so exasperatingly sympathetic to herself," wrote Ken Tucker in the New York Times Book Review. He observed, "The reader may well begin riffling the pages of the book in the vain hope that there will be a few complimentary Prozac capsules tucked inside for one's own relief." Kirkus Reviews thought the book to be filled with "narcissistic pride" and concluded, "By alternately belittling and belaboring her depression, Wurtzel loses her credibility: Either she's a brat who won't shape up or she needs the drugs. Ultimately, you don't care which."

On the other hand, the book is credited with launching the feminist disability memoir genre and with it Wurtzel was said to become "one of the first memoirists to write honestly and brutally about depression and addiction."

== See also ==
- Cosmetic pharmacology
- Eli Lilly and Company
- Let Them Eat Prozac (2004)
- Listening to Prozac (1993)
