= Violent non-state actor =

Groups independent of governments which use violence

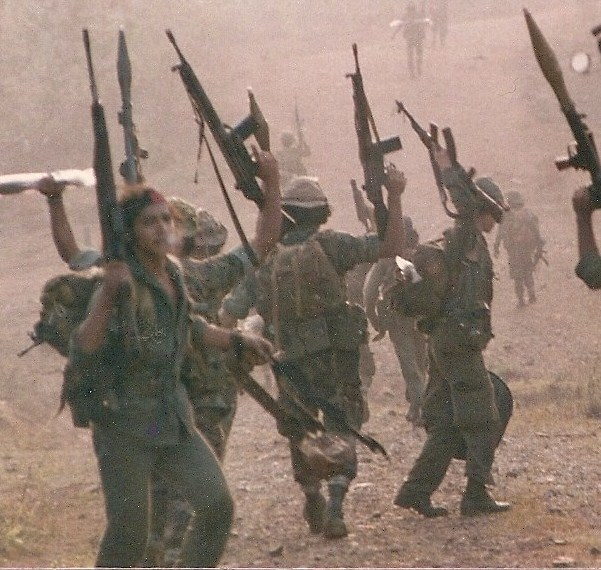
Contras in Nicaragua, 1987

In international relations, violent non-state actors (VNSAs), also known as non-state armed actors or non-state armed groups (NSAGs), are individuals or groups that are wholly or partly independent of governments and which threaten or use violence to achieve their goals.

VNSAs vary widely in their goals, size, and methods. They may include narcotics cartels, popular liberation movements, religious and ideological organizations, corporations (e.g. private military contractors), self-defence militia, and paramilitary groups established by state governments to further their interests.

While some VNSAs oppose governments, others are allied to them. Some VNSAs are organized as paramilitary groups, adopting methods and structure similar to those of state armed forces. Others may be informally structured and use violence in other ways, such as kidnapping, using improvised explosive devices, or hacking into computer systems.

== Description ==
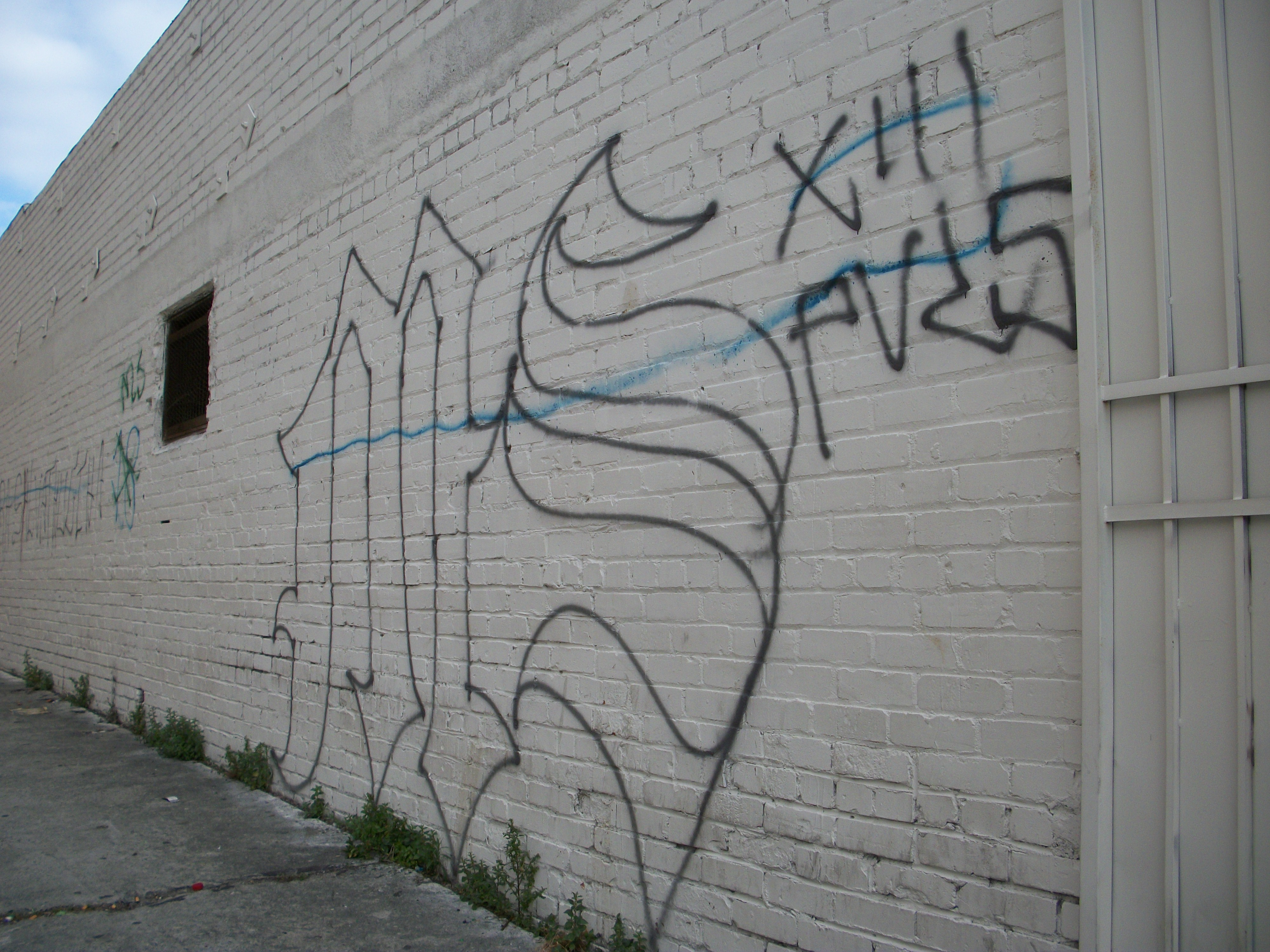
MS-13 gang graffiti

William Casebeer asserted in 2005 that "VNSA play a prominent, often destabilizing role in nearly every humanitarian and political crisis faced by the international community". As a new type of actor in international relations, VNSAs represent a departure from the traditional Westphalian sovereignty system of states in two ways: by providing an alternative to state governance; and by challenging the state's monopoly of violence.

Phil Williams stated in 2008 that in the 21st century, they "have become a pervasive challenge to nation-states". Williams argues that VNSAs develop out of poor state governance but also contribute to the further undermining of governance by the state. He explains that when weak states are "unable to create or maintain the loyalty and allegiance of their populations", "individuals and groups typically revert to or develop alternative patterns of affiliation". This causes the family, tribe, clan or other group to become "the main reference points for political action, often in opposition to the state". According to Williams, globalization has "not only... challenged individual state capacity to manage economic affairs, it has also provided facilitators and force multipliers for VNSAs". Transnational flows of arms, for example, are no longer under the exclusive surveillance of states. Globalization helps VNSAs develop transnational social capital and alliances as well as funding opportunities.

The term has been used in several papers published by the US military.

== Types ==
Violent non-state actors engage in combat in all terrains. Common and influential types of VNSAs include:

- Criminal organizations (drug cartels, for example) may carry out assassinations, kidnappings, thefts, extortions; operate protection rackets; and defend their turf from rival groups and the military.
- People's movements or sections of them that have chosen guerrilla tactics (also known as asymmetric warfare) to pursue their aims. An example is the Naxalite-Maoist insurgency in central India.
- Pirates, outlaws that rob ships or take hostages in order to get a ransom. Recent examples include piracy off the coast of Somalia. Some pirates also state that they serve as "coastguards" in place of a failed state.
- Private military companies, and corporations that either have their own, or hire, private military services. An example is floating armouries in the Indian Ocean. Private military companies are also active in counter-piracy, and thus provide an example of violent non-state actors combating other violent non-state actors.
- Violent non-state actors at sea. Both pirates and private military companies are also part of this group, along other less malicious actors, such as Neptune's Navy.
- Religious or ideological groups, such as Boko Haram in and around Nigeria, that espouse armed violence as a moral or sacred duty.
- Citizen militia, which may form to protect a locality from (or threaten it with) attack, such as the anti-balaka movement in the Central African Republic.
- Paramilitary groups, which make use of military methods and structures to pursue their agenda, such as the now-decommissioned Provisional Irish Republican Army.
- Warlords, who are leaders using armed violence to exercise military, economic, and political control over territory within a sovereign state. Warlords have a long history in Afghanistan, for example.

Phil Williams, in an overview article, identifies five types of VNSAs:

- Warlords
- Militias
- Insurgents
- Terrorist organizations
- Criminal organizations and gangs

== Relationship to terrorism ==
There is no commonly accepted definition of "terrorism", and the term is frequently used as a political tactic to denounce opponents whose status as terrorists is disputed. An attempt at a global definition appears in the working draft of Comprehensive Convention Against International Terrorism, which defines terrorism as a type of act, rather than as a type of group. Specifically, "terrorism" in the draft refers to the threatened or actual intentional injury to others, and serious damage to property resulting in major economic loss:

when the purpose of the conduct, by its nature or context, is to intimidate a population, or to compel a Government or an international organization to do or to abstain from doing any act.

== Use of children ==
Violent non-state actors have drawn international condemnation for relying heavily on children under the age of 18 as combatants, scouts, porters, spies, informants, and in other roles (although many state armed forces also recruit children). In 2017, for example, the United Nations identified 14 countries where children were widely used by armed groups: Afghanistan, Colombia, Central African Republic, Democratic Republic of the Congo, Iraq, Mali, Myanmar, Nigeria, Gaza - Palestinian Territories, The Philippines, Singapore, South Sudan, Sudan, Syria, and Yemen.

Not all armed groups use children, and approximately 60 that used to do so have entered agreements to reduce or end the practice since 1999. For example, by 2017 the Moro Islamic Liberation Front (MILF) in the Philippines had released nearly 2,000 children from its ranks, and the FARC-EP guerilla movement in Colombia agreed in 2016 to stop recruiting children. In other situations, the use of children was increasing in 2017, particularly in Afghanistan, Iraq, Nigeria and Syria, where Islamist militants and groups opposing them intensified efforts to recruit children.

== Humanitarian engagement ==
Researchers at the Overseas Development Institute propose that engagement with VNSAs, which they call armed non-state actors, is essential to humanitarian efforts in conflicts. They claim that it is often necessary to do so to facilitate access to those affected and to provide humanitarian assistance. However, humanitarian agencies often fail to engage strategically with VNSAs. This tendency has strengthened since the end of the Cold War, partly because of the strong discouragement of humanitarian engagement with VNSAs in counterterrorism legislation and donor funding restrictions. In their opinion, further study is necessary to identify ways in which humanitarian agencies can develop productive dialogue with VNSAs.

The International Security Department and the International Law Programme at Chatham House are seeking to understand the dynamics that will determine support for a principle-based approach to engagement by humanitarian actors with VNSAs.

== See also ==
- Fourth-generation warfare
- Guerrilla warfare
- Law without the state
- List of guerrilla movements
- List of rebel groups that control territory
- Non-state actor
- Organized crime
- Paramilitary
- Terrorism and Terror (politics)
- Vigilante
- Violent direct action
- Grey-zone (international relations)
