= Paul Root Wolpe =

Sociologist and bioethicist

- Born: February 26, 1957 (age 69); Charleston, South Carolina
- Education: University of Pennsylvania; Yale University
- Occupations: Sociologist, bioethicist

Paul Root Wolpe (born February 26, 1957), is an American sociologist and bioethicist. He is the Raymond F. Schinazi Distinguished Research Chair in Jewish Bioethics and a professor at Emory University in Atlanta, Georgia.

Wolpe served for 15 years as the Bioethicist for the National Aeronautics and Space Administration (NASA). He was Co-Editor of the American Journal of Bioethics (AJOB), and is Editor-In-Chief of AJOB Neuroscience, the official Journal of the International Neuroethics Society (INS). Wolpe is also a member of the board of directors Executive Committee of the INS.

He is the brother of David Wolpe.

== History ==
Wolpe was born on February 26, 1957, in Charleston, South Carolina. He completed his undergraduate degree in the sociology and psychology of religion at the University of Pennsylvania. Wolpe earned an M.A., M.Phil., and PhD from Yale University. He spent 3.5 years in the Department of Psychiatry at Jefferson Medical College. Wolpe returned to the University of Pennsylvania, where he taught for over 20 years. He was a Senior Fellow of Penn's Center for Bioethics where he directed the Scattergood Program for the Applied Ethics of Behavioral Health and the Program in Psychiatry and Ethics at the School of Medicine. He moved to the faculty of Emory University in 2008.

== Teaching and publications ==
Wolpe has written over 150 articles, editorials, encyclopedia articles, and book chapters in sociology, medicine, and bioethics, as well as general ethics. He co-authored the textbook Sexuality and Gender in Society, and the end-of-life guide Behoref Hayamim: In the Winter of Life.
