= Cosmetic pharmacology =

Cosmetic psychopharmacology, a term coined in 1990 by the psychiatrist Peter D. Kramer and popularized in his 1993 book Listening to Prozac, refers to the use of drugs to move persons from a normal psychological state to another normal state that is more desired or better socially rewarded — e.g., from melancholy towards assertiveness and confidence or from slower to quicker cognition.

The comparison is with surgery, in which the same intervention can be therapeutic (as in reparative work on burn victims) or cosmetic (as in rhinoplasty for the enhancement of beauty in conventional terms). In general, cosmetic psychopharmacology refers to the use of psychoactive medications by normal, healthy individuals for the purpose of enhancement rather than the treatment of a formal pathology. Kramer reported that with the antidepressant Prozac, occasional patients seemed "better than well," and he discussed the ethical dilemmas that might result if similar medications were offered to individuals not afflicted with psychiatric disorders. Following these case reports, much controversy arose over the veracity and ethics of the cosmetic use of actual antidepressants and other similar medications.

Opponents of cosmetic pharmacology believe that such drug usage is unethical and that the concept of cosmetic pharmacology is a manifestation of naive consumerism. Proponents, such as philosopher Arthur Caplan, state that it is an individual's (rather than the government's or physician's) right to determine whether to use a drug for cosmetic purposes.

Anjan Chatterjee, a neurologist at the University of Pennsylvania, has argued that western medicine stands on the brink of a neuro-enhancement revolution in which people will be able to improve their memory and attention through pharmacological means. Jacob M. Appel, a Brown University ethicist, has raised concerns about the possibility of employers mandating such enhancements for their workers.

== See also ==
- Performance-enhancing drugs
- Cognitive liberty
- Neuroenhancement
- Neuroethics
- Nootropics

== Scientific articles via PubMed ==
- Bjorklund P (April 2005). "Can there be a 'cosmetic' psychopharmacology? Prozac unplugged: the search for an ontologically distinct cosmetic psychopharmacology". Nurs Philos. 6 (2): 131–43. doi:10.1111/j.1466-769X.2005.00213.x. PMID 15787908.
