= Bitch: In Praise of Difficult Women =

- Author: Elizabeth Wurtzel
- Language: English
- Publisher: Doubleday
- Publication date: 1998
- Publication place: United States
- Pages: 434

Bitch: In Praise of Difficult Women is 1998 non-fiction book published by Doubleday and written by Elizabeth Wurtzel.

== Critical reception ==
The New York Times, "In the end, Bitch turns out to be another, livelier attempt by Wurtzel to figure out what kind of woman she'd like to be. It's not easy. Life may not have been happier, but it was surely simpler when a feminine ideal loomed over women's heads."

Commentary, "The front cover of Bitch shows a supremely confident, topless Wurtzel raising a middle finger to the world. This gesture of bravado is fully in keeping with the flagrant displays of carelessness that characterize the prose within."
