= Neurorealism =

Fallacy in popular science

Neurorealism (also referred to as neuro-realism or neuroessentialism) is a concept within popular science where individuals ascribe more meaning to psychological phenomena merely because it is backed up by brain research, including brain imaging methods.

== Overview ==
=== Etymology ===
The term "neurorealism" was first coined in 2005 by neuroscientists Eric Racine, Ofek Bar-Ilan, and Judy Illes. They noticed that media outlets were uncritical in their analysis of fMRI evidence in support of psychological processes, such as the relief from pain via acupuncture, political beliefs, and even pleasure from eating foods high in fat. They go on to conclude that neurorealism is "grounded in the belief that fMRI enables us to capture a ‘visual proof ’ of brain activity, despite the enormous complexities of data acquisition and image processing". The researchers encouraged journalists to be more conscientious of how they report topics related to neuroscience, given that neurological claims tend to hold more weight to the lay reader.

Researcher David Gruber commented that "currently, no research on neuro-realism examines the variable rhetorical roles of such statements, that is, how they support specialized arguments or enhance social functions across genres of public communication." He also states that neurorealism is a result of the over simplification of difficult scientific information, as it is usually fit for a more technical audience.

One group of researchers however concluded that "we argue that the “neurorealism” effect is weak at best, and highly context sensitive. This is not to discount the value of within-subjects designs for this area of study, since it is often the only way to conduct studies that result in nuanced differences in how stimuli affect individuals’ perceptions."

=== In other research ===
Psychologist Scott Lilienfeld commented that neuro-realism has a potential to affect jurors in punishing criminals afflicted with psychopathy. As a result, juries may place undue weight on brain imaging, even though differences in the brains of psychopaths and non-psychopaths do not necessarily indicate the differences are "congenital, immutable, or directly causative of behavioral deficits". According to Lilienfeld and others, arguments that psychopathic brain deficits negate criminal responsibility "require leaps" beyond the scientific data, as brain activity during an unrelated task does not explain a specific criminal act. Even among those diagnosed with psychopathy, criminal acts may reflect many factors beyond the personality disorder. Lilienfeld and his colleagues levied criticisms towards scientific journalism as a whole for engaging in "neurohype", or misrepresenting the impact of certain scientific findings, usually utilizing words such as "breakthrough","miracle","cure","revolutionary", "groundbreaking", and "marvel".

== See also ==
- Brain mapping
- Urban legend
- Magnetic resonance imaging
- Popular psychology
- Human brain
