= International Neuroethics Society =

Professional ethics organization

The International Neuroethics Society (INS) is a professional organization that studies the social, legal, ethical, and policy implications of advances in neuroscience. Its mission is to encourage and inspire research and dialogue on the responsible use of advances in brain science. The current INS President is Joseph J. Fins, MD.

== History ==
The INS was formed as the Neuroethics Society in May 2006 in Asilomar, California by a multidisciplinary group of 13 members, including neuroscientists, psychologists, philosophers, bioethicists and lawyers. This group formed the INS following the first meeting solely devoted to neuroethics held in San Francisco in 2002, entitled 'Neuroethics: Mapping the Field'. This meeting was co-hosted by Stanford University and the University of California, San Francisco (UCSF), and sponsored by the Dana Foundation. This event prompted the attending and future founders of the INS to meet again and discuss the creation of a society devoted to neuroethics. The formation of the Neuroethics Society was formally announced in July 2006.

The founding president of the INS was Professor Steven Hyman, who served as president from 2006 to 2014. Hyman stated that the role of the Society was to study the issues related to the nervous system that are not neatly contained within traditional bioethics, as well as to bridge the gap between advances in neuroscience and the world of policy and ethics.

The Neuroethics Society was renamed the International Neuroethics Society in 2011, prior to the Society's 2011 Annual Meeting, to reflect its international membership and mission.

The official journal of the INS is the American Journal of Bioethics-Neuroscience (AJOB-Neuroscience), which has Paul Root Wolpe as its Editor-in-Chief. The journal launched in 2007 as a section of the American Journal of Bioethics and became an independent journal in 2010, publishing four issues a year.

Past Presidents of the Society include: Nita Farahany (2019–2021), Hank Greely (2017–2019), Judy Illes (2016–2017), Barbara Sahakian (2014–2016), and Steven Hyman (2008–2014).

== Members ==
The INS is an international organisation, with over 300 members. Membership is open to anyone with an interest in neuroethics, including students, for whom there is a discounted rate.

== Governance ==
The INS is a non-profit organisation and was formed by a grant from the Dana Foundation. The society has its headquarters in Bethesda, Maryland, USA.

== Annual meeting ==
In May 2007, the INS sponsored a forum on the ethics of neuroenhancement in Washington, D.C., which was hosted by the Dana Foundation. This was followed by the first annual meeting of the INS in 2008, also held in Washington, DC. This 2-day meeting was held prior to the Society for Neuroscience (SfN) annual conference was attended by over 200 people.

Since 2010, the INS has continuously held a meeting annually as a satellite of the Society for Neuroscience conference. In addition to plenary speakers, panel discussions, networking and mentoring sessions, researchers are invited to present posters of their work. The dates, locations, themes and program information for past INS annual meetings are as follows:

Year	Dates	Location	Theme	Reference
2008	November 14–15	Washington, DC, USA		
2010	November 11–12	San Diego, CA, USA		
2011	November 10–11	Washington, DC, USA		
2012	November 11–12	New Orleans, LA, USA		
2013	November 7–8	San Diego, CA, USA		
2014	November 13–14	Washington, DC, USA		
2015	October 15–16	Chicago, IL, USA		
2016	November 10–11	San Diego, CA, USA		
2017	November 9–10	Washington, DC, USA	Honoring our History, Forging our Future	
2018	November 1–2	San Diego, CA, USA	Cutting Edge Neuroscience, Cutting Edge Neuroethics	
2019	October 17–18	Chicago, IL, USA	Mapping Neuroethics: An Expanded Vision	

In addition to the Annual Meeting, the INS collaborates with other organizations in programs on neuroethics and related topics each year, including events at the Federation of European Neuroscience Societies (FENS) and the British Neuroscience Association.

== Response to the Presidential Commission for the Study of Bioethical Issues ==
In 2014, the Presidential Commission for the Study of Bioethical Issues, which advises the President of the United States on bioethical issues arising from advances in biomedicine and related areas of science and technology, asked for public comment on the ethical considerations of neuroscience research and the application of neuroscience research findings. In response, the INS listed the top 12 areas of importance for consideration by the commission, which were published in the Journal of Law and the Biosciences. The INS detailed the top 5 important areas that will have an ethical impact on society as the Human Brain Projects (both the UK and USA versions), human enhancement (the use of 'smart drugs' by healthy people), neurotechnology, responsibility and the law and mental health and brain disorders. Members of the Presidential Commission attended the INS Annual Meeting in November 2014 to further discuss the ethical issues surrounding neuroscience research.
