= The Jewish Journal of Greater Los Angeles =

Newspaper in Los Angeles, California

- Type: Weekly newspaper
- Owner: TRIBE Media Corp
- President: David Suissa
- Editor-in-chief: David Suissa
- Editor: Susan Freudenheim (Executive); Jonathan Kirsch (Book)
- Founded: 1985; 41 years ago
- Headquarters: Los Angeles
- Circulation: 50,000; estimated readership of 150,000 (2016)
- Website: jewishjournal.com

The Jewish Journal of Greater Los Angeles, known simply as the Jewish Journal, is an independent, nonprofit community weekly newspaper serving the Jewish community of greater Los Angeles, published by the nonprofit TRIBE Media Corp.

The Journal was established in 1985. As of 2016, it had a verified circulation of 50,000 and an estimated readership of 150,000; it is the largest Jewish weekly outside New York City. TRIBE Media Corp. also produces the monthly TRIBE magazine, distributed in Santa Barbara, Malibu, Conejo, Simi and West San Fernando Valleys.

== History ==
Though independently incorporated, the paper was initially distributed in part by the Jewish Federation of Greater Los Angeles. The first issue appeared on February 28, 1986. The editor was Gene Lichtenstein, who served until 2000, and the first art director was Katherine Arion, a Romanian-born artist who came to the United States in 1981. After becoming completely independent from the Jewish Federation in 2005, it went through difficulties and its circulation shrank.

Circulation has recovered to 50,000 since then, and the paper has undertaken new initiatives, including expanded internet offerings, live events, a branding and marketing division, JJ Branding, TRIBE magazine, launched in December 2009, and Jewish Insider. The Jewish Journal, like other news media, faced financial pressures (cutting staff positions and salaries during 2009, though since it has resumed growth in both areas), but it strengthened its financial situation in May 2010, when it received commitments from a group of local Jewish philanthropists for additional funding intended to assure its continuing financial viability.

From the mid-nineties, Rob Eshman was the editor-in-chief and publisher of the Journal. He was succeeded by David Suissa in 2017. Contributing writers include Rabbi Bradley Shavit Artson, Karen Lehrman Bloch, Judea Pearl, Tabby Refael, Rabbi Yoshi Zweiback, and Jonathan Kirsch, who also serves as Book Editor. Shmuel Rosner is Senior Political Correspondent.

In the wake of the Charlie Hebdo terrorist attack, the issue of January 16–22, 2015 was renamed "Jewish Hebdo".

In response to some staff members' perception that the paper's focus had shifted to commentary, a group of journalists launched SoCal Jewish News in 2021.

== Reputation and content ==
The Jewish Journal is considered the institutional paper of the Jewish community in Los Angeles.

As of May 2016, the site reported about 4 million unique users per month.

The paper received five Rockower Awards in 2021, and ten Rockower Awards in 2022, including six first places. In 2023, the magazine was awarded 21 Rockower Awards. It received awards from the Los Angeles Press Club in 2005 and 2009.

== See also ==
- History of the Jews in Los Angeles
