= Moravian Academy =

School in Bethlehem, Pennsylvania, US

Coordinates: 40.678945°N 75.311794°W

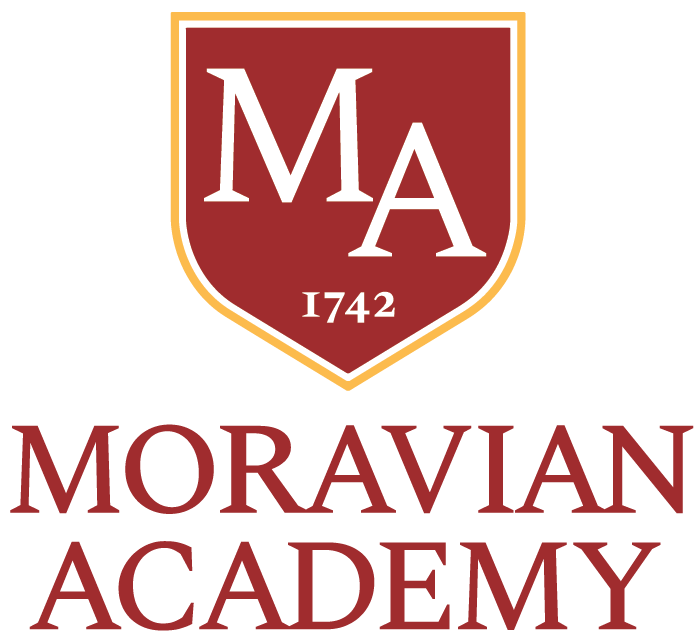

Location
- Merle-Smith Campus: 4313 Green Pond Road, Bethlehem, Pennsylvania 18020 Downtown Campus: 7 E. Market Street, Bethlehem, Pennsylvania 18018 Swain Campus: 1100 S 24th St, Allentown, Pennsylvania 18103

Information
- Type: Independent, Coeducational, and College Preparatory School
- Motto: More to Explore
- Established: 1742; 284 years ago 1971
- Founder: Benigna Zinzendorf
- Campus Director: Merle-Smith Campus - Dr. Rachel Wright Downtown Campus - Dr. Abby Mahone Swain Campus - Megan Franzyshen
- Head of school: Adrianne Finley Odell
- Faculty: 173 (on an FTE basis)
- Grades: Preschool – 12
- Enrollment: 860 (2025-26)
- Student to teacher ratio: 6:1
- Campus: Suburb Urban
- Colors: Red, Gold, and White
- Athletics conference: Colonial League
- Mascot: Merle-Smith Campus: Lion Historic Downtown Campus: Snow Leopard Swain Campus: Cougar
- Website: www.moravianacademy.org

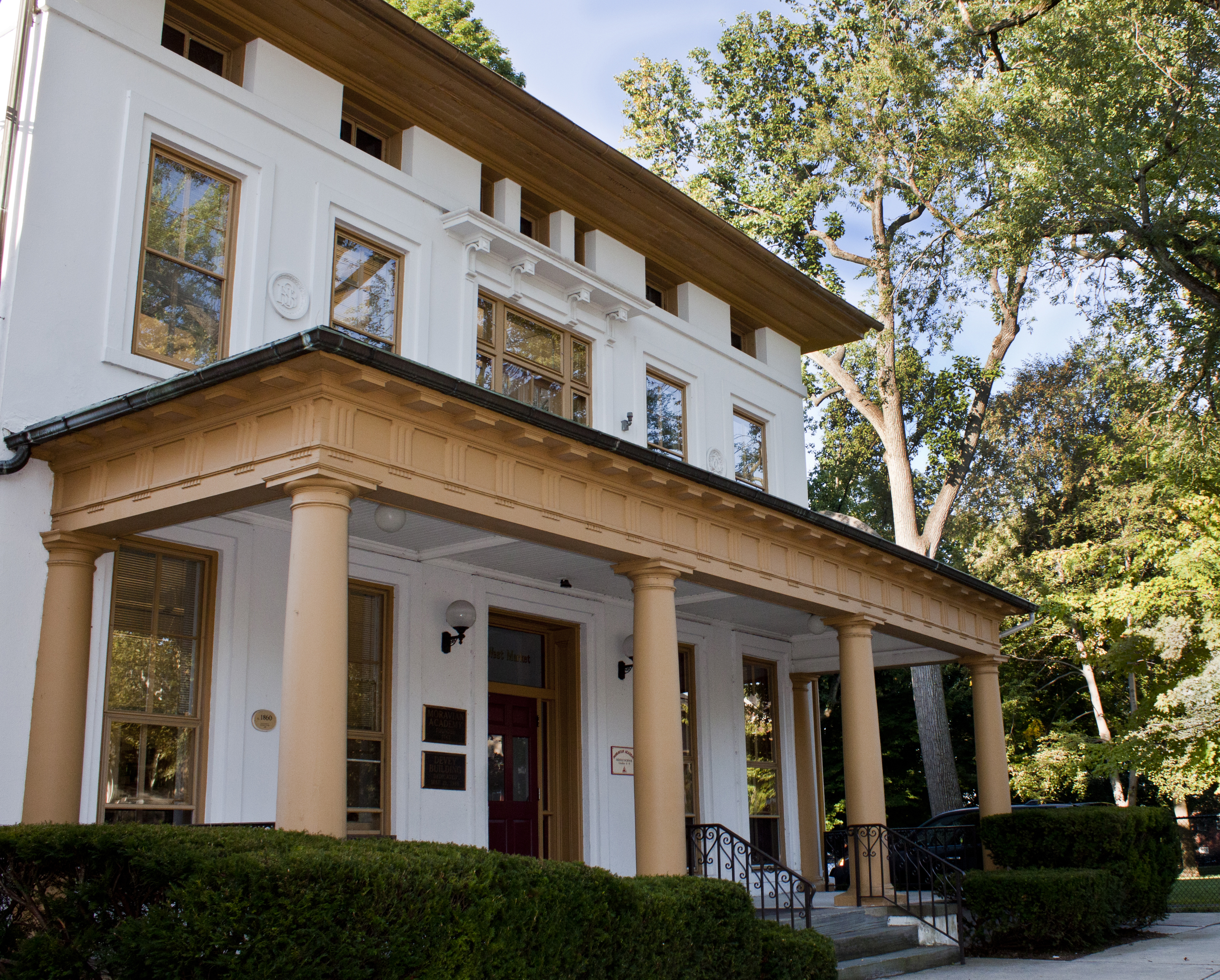
The Devey Building on the Downtown Campus

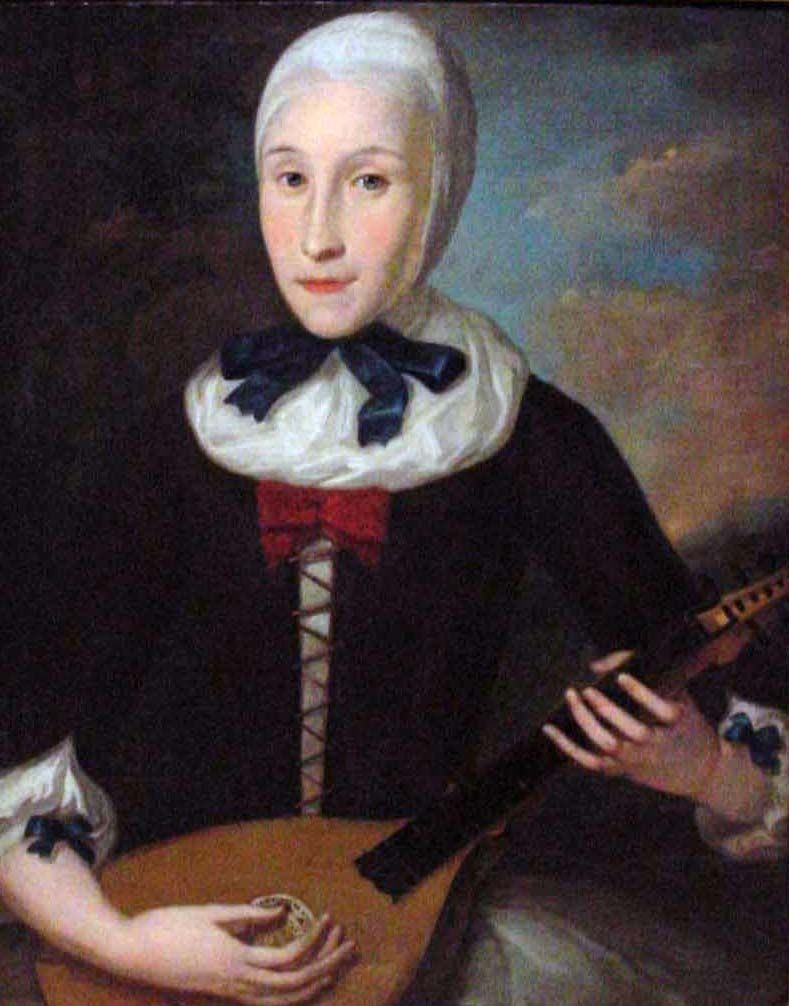
A portrait of Countess Benigna Zinzendorf

Moravian Academy is a preschool through 12th-grade independent, co-educational, college preparatory school in the Lehigh Valley region of eastern Pennsylvania. Moravian Academy is one of the oldest independent schools in the United States.

The school has 860 students and 200 employees from across the region located on three campuses. The Upper School and one Preschool-Grade 8 campus are in Bethlehem and the other Preschool-Grade 8 campus is in Allentown.

Mission: Moravian Academy states that its mission is to educate students in a coeducational, college-preparatory environment that emphasizes critical thinking, effective communication, ethical leadership, and global citizenship.

Vision: According to the school, Moravian Academy’s vision emphasizes fostering a learning community that values creativity, curiosity, and personal growth, with the goal of preparing students to explore their identities and future roles in society.

Core Values: Moravian Academy identifies four core values that guide its educational philosophy: community engagement, academic excellence, integrity, and curiosity.

== Portrait of a Graduate ==
Moravian Academy has developed a framework known as its “Portrait of a Graduate,” which outlines a set of skills and competencies the school seeks to cultivate in its students. These include communication, ethical and global awareness, resilience, critical and creative thinking, empathy, and personal well-being.

== Affiliations and Recognition ==
Villars Institute Learning Partner

Moravian Academy is a Learning Partner of the Villars Institute, a global program that connects secondary schools with international research institutions to support student-led sustainability research and interdisciplinary collaboration.

Pennsylvania Seal of Biliteracy

Moravian Academy is recognized by the Commonwealth of Pennsylvania as a participating school in the Pennsylvania Seal of Biliteracy program, which acknowledges high school graduates who demonstrate proficiency in English and at least one additional world language.

National Association of Independent Schools (NAIS)

Moravian Academy is a member of the National Association of Independent Schools (NAIS), an organization that represents independent schools and promotes best practices, professional development, and research in independent education.

Pennsylvania Association of Independent Schools (PAIS)

Moravian Academy is a member of the Pennsylvania Association of Independent Schools (PAIS), a nonprofit accrediting association that supports independent schools through evaluation, professional growth, and educational standards.

Middle States Association of Colleges and Schools (MSA-CESS)

Moravian Academy is accredited by the Middle States Association of Colleges and Schools, a regional accrediting organization that evaluates educational institutions based on standards related to governance, academic quality, and institutional effectiveness.

Niche Best Schools 2026

Moravian Academy was listed in Niche’s Best Schools 2026 rankings, which are based on a combination of academic data, student and parent reviews, and other publicly available information.

Historic Moravian Bethlehem World Heritage Site

The Historic Downtown Campus of Moravian Academy is located within the Historic Moravian Bethlehem National Historic Landmark District. In 2024, the district was inscribed as part of the Moravian Church Settlements–Bethlehem designation on the UNESCO World Heritage List. The inscription recognizes the historical significance of the original Moravian settlement in Bethlehem, which includes preserved 18th-century buildings and cultural sites.

== History ==
Moravian Academy was founded in 1742. The school's highlights include:

=== 18th century ===
- 1742: Countess Benigna Von Zinzendorf opens Moravian Seminary for Girls.

=== 20th century ===
- 1971: Moravian Preparatory School and Moravian Seminary for Girls merged to create Moravian Academy.
- June 10, 1972: First joint graduation ceremony with thirty nine graduating students.
- 1987: The first issue of the Moravian Academy Journal was published.
- 1991: Moravian Academy publishes “Mind, Body, and Spirit: Moravian Academy 1742-1992.”
- 1992: 250th Anniversary Celebration of the forming of Moravian Academy.

The History of the Swain School

- 1929: D.Esther Swain opens the Swain School.
- 1990: The Swain School celebrates 60 years

=== 21st century ===
- 2020: Moravian Academy and the Swain School Merge to form a three campus school, Moravian Academy. Each campus is named: Merle-Smith Campus, Historic Downtown Campus, and Swain Campus.
- 2022: Moravian Academy installs the first women head of school, Adrianne Finley Odell.

== Schools ==
=== Beginning School ===
The Beginning School includes preschool, pre-kindergarten, and kindergarten classes on the Historic Downtown and Swain Campuses.

=== Lower School ===
The Lower School serves students in first through fifth grades on the Historic Downtown and Swain Campuses.

=== Middle School ===
The Middle School serves students in sixth through eighth grades on the Historic Downtown and Swain Campuses.

=== Upper School ===
The Upper School serves ninth through 12th grade students on the Merle-Smith Campus.

== Administration ==
Countess Benigna Von Zinzendorf, founded the school in 1742. Since then, the heads of the school have been:

- Reverend Edwin Sawyer, president (1971-1973)
- David J Devey, head master (1973-1988)
- Peter Sipple, head master (1988-1998)
- Barnaby Roberts, head master (1998-2007)
- George King, head master (2007-2016)
- Jeffrey M. Zemsky, head of school (2016-2022)
- Adrianne Finley Odell, head of school (2022–present)

== Notable alumni ==
- Catherine Drinker Bowen, author
- Sally Kohn, liberal political commentator
- Santo Loquasto, actor and Tony Award winner
- Gilmer McCormick, actress
- Prachi Gupta, journalist and author
