= Benigna Zinzendorf =

German-born missionary

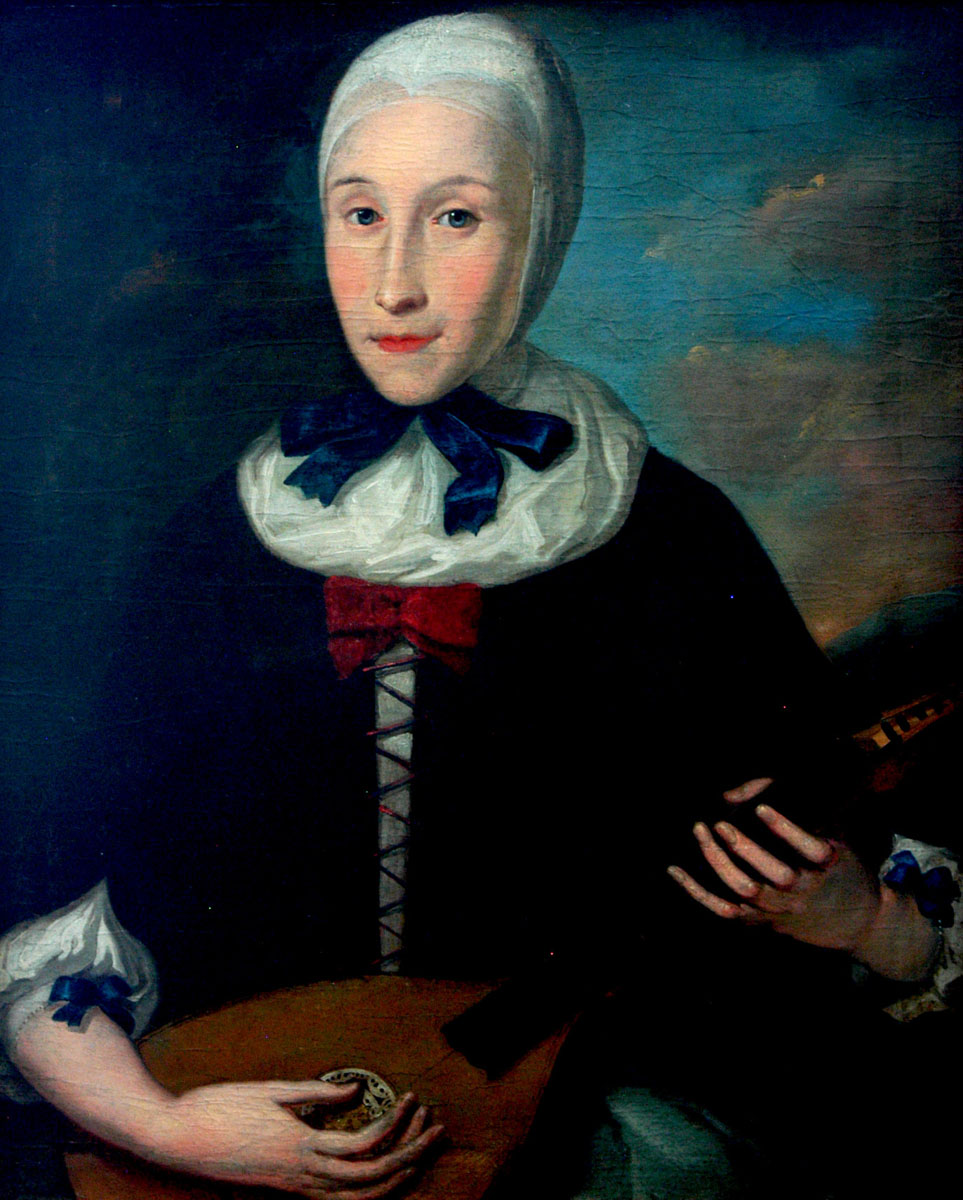
- Benigna Zinzendorf playing the cittern
- Born: 28 December 1725; Berthelsdorf
- Died: 11 May 1789 (aged 63); Herrnhut
- Occupation: Missionary
- Spouse(s): Johannes von Watteville
- Parent(s): Nicolaus Zinzendorf; Erdmuthe Dorothea of Reuss-Ebersdorf

Benigna Zinzendorf, also known as Henrietta Benigna Justine Zinzendorf von Watteville (1725–1789), was the founder of the first boarding school for girls in the British American colonies, which became Moravian University and Moravian Academy. She was a missionary among Native Americans and assisted her father, Count Nicolaus Zinzendorf, and her husband, Bishop Johannes Langguth, in their religious activities in Europe and America. She enjoyed music and was an Eldress to girls' choirs beginning at the age of 14 and was a leader in an adult choir after she was married.

== Early life and education ==
Countess Henrietta Benigna Justine von Zinzendorf und Pottendorf, born in Berthelsdorf in Saxony on December 28, 1725, was the daughter of Count Nicolaus Zinzendorf and Countess Erdmuthe Dorothea of Reuss-Ebersdorf. She was among the four of twelve children who lived past the age of five. The four children, born between 1725 and 1738, were Benigna, Christian Renatus, Maria Agnes, and Elizabeth.

Her parents, Pietist Lutherans, lived in Castle Berthelsdorf until Benigna was two years of age. They moved to a parcel of land that her father had provided to the community founded on his land called Herrnhut by religious refugees from Moravia. They were descendants of the original followers of the Protestant Jan Hus. Both of her parents became involved with the Moravians and conducted a number of missionary journeys, sometimes bringing their daughter with them.

As a young girl, Zinzendorf was a well-liked and cheerful girl, but she had a delicate constitution after surviving a serious illness. She had a Moravian governess from whom she received her education, and became religious due to the influence of her governess and her parents. She was a good singer and played the cittern, a baroque type of guitar. At the age of 14, she was made an Eldress to the Children's Choir (four to twelve years of age) and at nineteen she became the Eldress of the Older Girls' Choir (up to 19 years of age). Her role was to help, advise, and counsel the singers.

Authorities in Saxony became aware of the religious activities at Herrnhut, which resulted in a ten-year period of exile (about 1737 to 1747) of Nicolaus Zinzendorf from his land. She went with her father to Holland, and then sailed to America in December 1741. During the trip across the Atlantic Ocean, she helped her father by writing down the hymns that he composed during the journey. They settled in Germantown, Philadelphia, after which she travelled with her father and several others to the Moravian settlement, Forks on the Delaware, which was named Bethlehem on Christmas Eve 1741 by her father.

== Bethlehem Female Seminary ==
On May 4, 1742, Zinzendorf founded a girls' school, initially at Germantown, Philadelphia, Pennsylvania, but in less than two months it was moved to Bethlehem, Pennsylvania. The school, called Bethlehem Female Seminary, was the first boarding school for girls in the British American colonies. The curriculum included writing, reading, household arts, and religion. Originally established to educate 25 students, it ultimately became the Moravian University and Moravian Academy. She established a staff so that she could embark on missionary journeys with her father.

== Missionary ==
Beginning in July 1742, Zinzendorf journeyed into the wilderness with her father to perform missions with local Native Americans. They were successful in spreading Christianity, with some people becoming preachers.

After her marriage, her husband was made Bishop and she traveled with him across the Atlantic in July 1748. She was centered in Bethlehem, while her husband traveled through North America and the West Indies. She went on missions to Native American settlements and assisted her husband while he was in Bethlehem. She also reconnected with the girls' school she founded in Bethlehem.

== Herrnhaag and Herrnhut ==
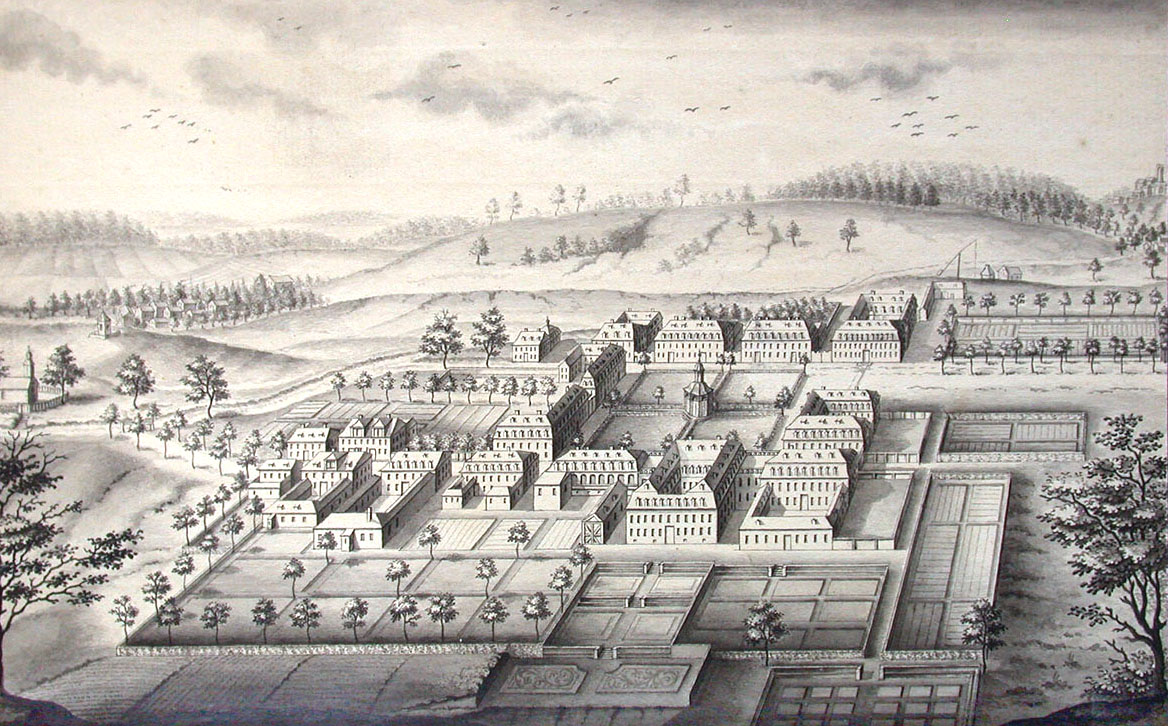
Herrnhaag as it looked in 1750.

She traveled with her father to England and then Herrnhaag, Germany between January and late April 1743. She was the supervisor and headmistress of the girls' establishment at Herrnhaag, which became her headquarters. In 1744, she attended a Synod meeting of the Brethren at (nearby and sister town) Marienborn. It was one of the few times that Zinzendorf was with her three siblings and parents in the same place, due to missionary work and the ten-year exile from his land.

After her marriage, she became a member of the Married People's Choir and assisted her husband in his ministry. Zinzendorf and her husband returned to Herrnhaag in January 1750 after their trip to America. The community had grown to 1,000 people, but due to religious persecution, the community moved within three years to Herrnhut.

== Marriage and children ==
Her father's secretary, Johannes Langguth, the adopted son of Baron Friedrich von Watteville was arranged to marry Benigna Zinzendorf, by her father, with her and her mother's approval. She appreciated Langguth's devotion and beliefs. Langguth became the Baron von Watteville before their wedding, which was officiated by her father during a Synod meeting in Zeist, Netherlands in 1746.

Their first child, Johann Ludwig, was born on March 7, 1752, in Herrnhut. Anna Dorthea Elizabeth was born on April 25, 1754. According to the custom of their religion, the children stayed at the nursery, leaving their parents to continue on with their work for the church. In the meantime, her brother Renatus died in England of tuberculosis and her mother died later on June 19, 1756.

== Descendants ==
Her six-times great granddaughter, M. Blair Gericke graduated from Moravian College in May 2011 with a bachelor's degree in Nursing. Rt. Rev. M. Blair Couch, Blair's mother, was an ordained minister and bishop in the Moravian Church; She graduated from Moravian College in 1978.
