= Prachi Gupta =

American journalist and author

- Education: University of Pittsburgh (BA, 2009)
- Occupations: Journalist, author
- Notable work: They Called Us Exceptional (2023)

Prachi Gupta is an American journalist and author. She has held staff positions at Salon, Cosmopolitan, and Jezebel, and her writing has appeared in The Atlantic, The Guardian, The Washington Post, and other publications. Her debut memoir, They Called Us Exceptional: And Other Lies That Raised Us, was published by Crown in 2023 and was longlisted for the PEN/Open Book Award.

== Early life and education ==
Gupta grew up in the suburbs of Philadelphia in an Indian American family. Her father was a physician. Gupta attended Moravian Academy. She graduated from the University of Pittsburgh in 2009 with degrees in English and finance.

Gupta's younger brother, Yush Gupta, was a computer engineer who graduated from Carnegie Mellon University in 2010 with a degree in electrical and computer engineering. He interned at SpaceX, where he helped develop software for the Dragon spacecraft, and later served as chief technology officer of bitcoin company LibertyX. In 2017, he died at age 29 from a blood clot following elective limb-lengthening surgery. His death prompted Gupta to examine the pressures facing their family and became the basis for her essay "Stories About My Brother" and her subsequent memoir.

== Career ==
Gupta began her journalism career at Salon, where she served as an assistant news editor covering pop culture and entertainment. She later joined Cosmopolitan, where she reported on the 2016 presidential election. In September 2016, her interview with Ivanka Trump about the Trump campaign's child care proposal drew wide media attention after Trump ended the interview early.

Gupta later worked as a senior reporter at Jezebel, where she co-hosted the politics podcast Big Time Dicks. She also served as a contributing politics editor at Refinery29 and as a segment producer on Crooked Media's podcast Lovett or Leave It.

In 2019, Jezebel published Gupta's long-form investigative essay "Stories About My Brother," about the death of her estranged brother and the pressures facing Indian American families. The essay won a 2020 Writers Guild of America Award and was named one of the best essays of 2019 by Longform and Longreads. Her reporting was also included in The Best American Magazine Writing 2021.

== They Called Us Exceptional ==
Gupta's debut memoir, They Called Us Exceptional: And Other Lies That Raised Us, was published by Crown on August 22, 2023. Written as a letter to her mother, the book examines the model minority myth and its effects on her Indian American family, weaving personal narrative with history and research. The essay "Stories About My Brother" served as the basis for the memoir.

Publishers Weekly gave the book a starred review. Kirkus Reviews called it "a fraught memoir of life in a psychically tangled Indian American household." BookPage described it as "a complicated and emotional memoir" and praised the writing as among the best treatments of the model minority myth.

The book was longlisted for the PEN/Open Book Award and nominated for a Goodreads Choice Award. It was named one of the best books of the season by The New York Times, The Washington Post, and The Boston Globe.
