= Karen Lehrman Bloch =

American writer and cultural critic

Karen Lehrman Bloch is an American writer and cultural critic.

== Career ==
Lehrman Bloch's criticism of women's studies programs in a September/October 1993 cover story for Mother Jones magazine "ignited heated exchanges in the women's studies community, the press, and on radio talk shows around the country." In the subsequent November/December issue, Mother Jones published 14 responses to Lehrman Bloch's piece, most prominently feminist writer Susan Faludi.

In 1994, Lehrman Bloch told The Boston Globe, "Feminism has become orthodoxy. There's a great stigma about speaking out, like you're breaking the sisterhood. So no one does." Writing in The New York Times in 1995, ACLU activist Wendy Kaminer called Lehrman Bloch "perhaps the sharpest of the young individualist critics" of third-wave feminism. In her 1997 book The Lipstick Proviso: Women, Sex & Power in the Real World, Lehrman Bloch voiced her concerns about what she called "group-think" feminism.

In 2021, Lehrman Bloch launched White Rose Magazine, where she serves as editor-in-chief. The magazine, named after the White Rose resistance group in Nazi Germany, is dedicated to classical liberalism and opposing extremism. In an interview for the Jewish Journal in 2022, Lehrman Bloch explained why she believes classical liberalism is being subverted and how White Rose provides a path back to classical liberal principles, like heterodoxy and ethics.

== Books ==
- The Lipstick Proviso: Women, Sex & Power in the Real World. Doubleday. 1997.
- The Inspired Home: Interiors of Deep Beauty. Harper Design. 2013.
- Passage to Israel. Skyhorse. 2016.
