= Neuroethics Research Unit =

Canadian research institute

Coordinates: 45°30′48″N 73°34′33″W

The Neuroethics Research Unit was created in 2006, at the Institut de recherches cliniques de Montréal (IRCM), which is affiliated to the Université de Montréal. The Unit is one of the pioneer units in Canada in this area of research. Neuroethics is a new area of research where bioethics and neuroscience intersect. The focus is on ethical considerations in neuroscience research and the many ethical issues that arise from the transfer of neuroscience to health care.

== Research themes ==
The Neuroethics research unit pursues research within the fields of public and intercultural, clinical, research, reflexive, or theoretical neuroethics to address a large spectrum of challenges in neurological and psychiatric care such as providing quality patient information, diminishing stigma, and promoting respectful healthcare services. The Unit’s research themes cover subjects as diverse as MRI, end-of-life decision making, cognitive enhancement, ethical policy, etc.

== Funding ==
Research projects of the Neuroethics Research Unit are funded by the Canadian Institutes of Health Research, the Natural Sciences and Engineering Research Council of Canada and the Social Sciences and Humanities Research Council.

== Outreach ==
In June 2007, at the annual meeting of the Canadian Bioethics Society (CBS) held in Toronto, over 70 attendees met to discuss the need to learn more about Canadian and international advances in neuroethics including research, funding, and events. A new interest group was launched. One of the group’s strongest recommendations was to create a newsletter, featuring forthcoming events and literature updates. BRAINSTORM was born.

The Unit also created the Montreal Neuroethics Network. Its main goal is to organize neuroethics talks, seminars, workshops and symposia in Montreal to develop neuroethics in Montreal in both Academia and in the community.
