= Listening to Prozac =

1993 book by Peter D. Kramer

- Cover of Listening to Prozac
- Author: Peter D. Kramer
- Publisher: Viking Press
- Publication date: June 1993
- ISBN: 0-670-84183-8

Listening to Prozac: A Psychiatrist Explores Antidepressant Drugs and the Remaking of the Self is a book written by psychiatrist Peter D. Kramer. Written in 1993, the book discusses how the advance of the anti-depressant drug Prozac might change the way we see personality, the relationship between neurology and personality.

Kramer coined the term "cosmetic pharmacology", and in this book he discusses the philosophical, ethical and social consequences of using psychopharmacology to change one's personality. He asks if it is ethically defensible to treat a healthy individual to, for instance, help him climb a career, or on the other hand, if it is ethically defensible to deny him that possibility. Listening to Prozac spent 4 months on the New York Times best seller's list and its influence prompted critics to write books with sound alike names such as Peter Breggin's Talking Back to Prozac.

The Fort Lauderdale Sun Sentinel described the book as "one of the most provocative popular science books published in 1993", stating that "Kramer is in full command of the array of knowledge – from cellular biology to animal studies to literature – that he draws upon to put the impact of antidepressants into perspective. In his hands, ancient ideas suddenly seem vital again, cast in a new and disquieting light by Prozac."

In a review in the New York Review of Books, Sherwin B. Nuland said that Kramer has "played fast and loose with the most basic principles by which physicians evaluate clinical experience and propose new ways of explaining or treating illness. Those principles require (1) meticulous and personally made observations of an illness or maladaptive state; (2) even-handed review of all pertinent publications that bear on the problem; (3) scrupulous attention to every fragment of clinical evidence, whether or not it supports the observer’s evolving hypothesis; and (4) a commitment not to speculate beyond what is justified by the accumulated data and its supportable implications." Nuland said that Kramer has used his preliminary observations to hype unjustified assertions in trade books and on TV shows, orchestrated by professional publicists. Kramer responded to this review, stating that Nuland "goes on tediously establishing his bona fides as an old-style doctor (trained by the ostensibly witty Dr. Bean, familiar with the story of serotonin, etc., etc.)—and then fails to illustrate his attack with a single specific."

The Kirkus Reviews described Listening to Prozac as "thoughtful questioning is supported throughout by case histories and meaty reports on recent research.... A wise and unflinching examination of the ramifications for society--and for the individual--when the capsule replaces the couch."

Daniel X. Freedman, former president of the American Psychiatric Association, wrote that Listening to Prozac “does not provide reliable directions for those in troubled quest of self or those seeking a clear introduction to the brain sciences and pharmacology.”

== Publishing Information ==
- Hardcover Edition: (June 1993)
  - Publisher: Viking Press
  - ISBN 0-670-84183-8
- Paperback Edition: (June 1994)
  - Publisher: Penguin USA
  - ISBN 0-14-015940-1

== See also ==
- Prozac
- Cosmetic pharmacology
- Eli Lilly and Company
