= Peter D. Kramer =

American psychiatrist

- Born: October 22, 1948 (age 77); New York City, U.S.
- Education: Harvard University, University College London
- Occupation: Psychiatrist
- Employer: Brown Medical School

Peter D. Kramer (born October 22, 1948) is an American psychiatrist and faculty member of Brown Medical School specializing in the area of clinical depression.

== Early life ==
Peter D. Kramer was born on October 22, 1948, in New York City to Jewish Holocaust survivors. He graduated from Harvard University with a bachelor of arts degree in 1970 and an MD in 1976. He was a Marshall Scholar in literature at University College London in 1970-72. He did his residency at Yale University.

== Bibliography ==
=== Books ===
- Death of the Great Man (2023)
- Ordinarily Well: The Case for Antidepressants (2016)
- Freud: Inventor of the Modern Mind (2006)
- Against Depression (2005)
- Spectacular Happiness: A Novel (2001)
- Should You Leave? (1997)
- Listening to Prozac (1993)
- Moments of Engagement: Intimate Psychotherapy in a Technological Age (1989)

=== Book introductions ===
- The Art of Loving, by Erich Fromm
- On Becoming a Person, by Carl Rogers
- Better Than Well, by Carl Elliott
- The Therapist is the Therapy by L. B, Fierman

=== Book chapters ===
- Nonsense! in A Blauner (ed), The Peanuts Papers (2019)

=== Articles ===
- "Will AI soon diagnose politicians’ mental health conditions from afar?" STAT, (2023)
- "Why Are We So Eager to Hear “Placebo” Speak?" LLos Angeles Review of Books, (2016)
- "Why Doctors Need Stories", The New York Times (2014)
- "In Defense of Antidepressants", The New York Times (2011)
- "The Valorization of Sadness" (from The Hastings Center Report) (2000)

=== Short fiction ===
- "After Alice Left" TriQuarterly, #135/136 (2010)
- "The Name of the Helper", Prick of the Spindle (2010)
- "Permutations", Summerset Review (2011)
