= Eric Racine =

Canadian medical academic (born 1976)

- Born: March 26, 1976 (age 50)
- Education: Undergraduate training in Philosophy and Political science Master's degree in philosophy
- Alma mater: University of Ottawa; Université de Montréal

Eric Racine (March 26, 1976) FCAHS, is the Director of the Pragmatic Health Ethics Research Unit based at the Montreal Clinical Research Institute, a research professor at the Université de Montréal and the Montreal Clinical Research Institute, and an adjunct professor in the Department of Neurology and Neurosurgery at McGill University.

== Education ==
Racine pursued his undergraduate training in Philosophy and Political science at the University of Ottawa (1995–1999) and graduated summa cum laude. He then moved to Montreal to pursue a master's degree in philosophy, under the supervision of Professor Daniel Laurier at the Université de Montréal (1999–2001). His master's thesis proposed an advanced integration of insights from artificial intelligence and cognitive science. This work was later published in his book Pragmatic Neuroethics in 2010. Racine then pursued a doctorate in Applied Human Sciences at the Université de Montréal. He undertook a multi-site interview-based field study of clinical ethics committees under the supervision of Hubert Doucet. At that time, Racine also published some of his first academic papers on discourse ethics and neuroethics. Racine joined the Stanford Center for Biomedical Ethics (2004–2006) to work under the supervision of Judy Illes, who is now based at the University of British Columbia as a Distinguished University Scholar and the Emeritus Director of the Program in Neuroethics at Stanford University. Racine has published a book in the field of neuroethics exploring topics related to public understandings of neuroscience and the ethics of neurotechnology.

== Career/Affiliations ==
- Full Research Professor and Director, Pragmatic Health Ethics Research Unit, Montreal Clinical Research Institute.
- Full Research Professor, Department of Medicine, Faculty of Medicine, Université de Montreal.
- Full Research Professor, Department of Social and Preventive Medicine, Faculty of Medicine, Université de Montreal.
- Associate Member, Biomedical Ethics Unit, McGill University.
- Associate Member, Department of Medicine, Division of Experimental Medicine, McGill University.
- Adjunct Professor, Department of Neurology and Neurosurgery, McGill University.
- Affiliate Member, Neuroethics Canada, University of British Columbia.

== Research ==
Racine's research program furthers pragmatic theory as developed by American philosopher John Dewey (1859–1952). His program is founded upon agent-based epistemologies alongside participatory and qualitative research methodologies to explore topics related to human flourishing. His work touches upon topics such as transition care, addiction, and health-related stigma. His work is funded by the Canadian Institutes of Health Research (CIHR), the Social Sciences and Humanities Research Council (SSHRC), and the Fonds de recherche du Québec – Santé (FRQ-S).

Racine and his colleagues have coined and popularized the term "neurorealism", the phenomenon of journalistic outlets ascribing more meaning to psychological data because it is accompanied by brain imagery.

Racine has published over 175 peer-reviewed papers and has lectured in academic institutions and political circles in over 20 countries across the globe.
