= William Casebeer =

William D. Casebeer (born 1969) is an American intelligence analyst, ethicist and author. He is notable in his fields of the evolution of morality, philosophy of mind, cognitive science and national security policy, military ethics, political violence, philosophy of mind, and human performance.

He is a retired U.S. Air Force Lieutenant Colonel, recipient of two meritorious service medals and former Defense Advanced Research Projects Agency (DARPA) program manager. Since 2020 he is the Director of Artificial Intelligence and Machine Learning in Riverside Research.

== Education ==
In 1991 Casebeer completed a Bachelor of Science (political science and government) at the United States Air Force Academy; a Masters of Arts in philosophy at University of Arizona in 1996; a joint PhD in cognitive science and philosophy from University of California, San Diego in 2001; and in 2006 a Masters of Arts in national security studies from Naval Postgraduate School.

== Career ==
Casebeer served in the US government Defense Department for some two decades, including as associate professor of philosophy at United States Air Force Academy; Chief, Eurasia Section, EUCOM Survey Division NATO SHAPE; Deputy Head at Joint Warfare Analysis Center; and Program Manager at DARPA. He retired from the U.S. Air Force as Lieutenant Colonel in 2011, and moved into senor positions in national security in the private sector, including at Lockheed Martin.

In 2013 Casebeer served on the Presidential Commission for the Study of Bioethical Issues.

Since 2020 he is the Director of Artificial Intelligence and Machine Learning in Riverside Research. His research there has garnered interest from a variety of fields.

Casebeer is the author of Natural Ethical Facts: Evolution, Connectionism, and Moral Cognition (2003); co-author of Warlords Rising: Confronting Violent Non-State Actors (2005); and has published on a range of topics from the morality of torture interrogation to the rhetoric of evil in international relations.

== Honors ==
- Meritorious service medals, US. Air Force: 1998, 2004
- Maj. Gen. Robert E. Linhard Award, Air Force Institute for National Security Studies, 2004

== Selected publications ==
- Natural Ethical Facts: Evolution, Connectionism, and Moral Cognition. 2003. Cambridge, MA: MIT Press. ISBN 978-0-262-27002-1
- 'Moral Cognition and Its Neural Constituents.' Nature Reviews: Neurosciences 4: 841–847.
- (With Troy Thomas and Steve Kiser) Warlords Rising: Confronting Violent Non-State Actors, Lexington Press (New York, NY), 2005. ISBN 978-0-7391-1189-5
- (With Barak A. Salmoni) 'Culture As An Open System: Social Intellgience, Human Terrain, and Counter-Insurgency', American Intelligence Journal, Volume 24 (Summer 2006) pp. 9–14
- (With Kevin Chan, Brian David Johnson, and Patrick McDaniel) Autonomous Systems & Emerging Technology, 7 Penn. St. J.L. & Int'l Aff. 35 (2020)
- Contributing author in Artificial intelligence and global security: Future trends, threats and considerations. 2020. ISBN 978-1-78973-812-4
- Contributing author in Human, Machine, War: How the Mind-Tech Nexus Will Win Future Wars. Edited by Nicholas Wright, Michael Miklaucic, Todd Veazie ISBN 978-1-58566-334-7
