= Judy Illes =

Canadian neuroscientist

Judy Illes OC
- Born: April 30, 1960 (age 66); Montreal, Quebec, Canada
- Education: Stanford University
- Scientific career
- Fields: Neuroethics
- Workplaces: Neuroethics Canada; University of British Columbia

Judy Illes, OC FRSC, FCAHS, (born April 30, 1960) is Professor of Neurology and Distinguished University Scholar in Neuroethics at the University of British Columbia. She is Director of Neuroethics Canada at UBC, and faculty in the Brain Research Centre at UBC and at the Vancouver Coastal Health Research Institute. She also holds affiliate appointments in the School of Population and Public Health and the School of Journalism at UBC, and in the Department of Computer Science and Engineering at the University of Washington in Seattle, WA. USA. She was appointed a member of the Order of Canada in 2017, and was promoted to an Officer in 2025.

== Research focus ==
Illes' research focuses on the ethical, legal, social and policy challenges specifically at the intersection of the neurosciences and biomedical ethics. This includes studies on advanced neurotechnologies in basic and clinical research, regenerative medicine, dementia, addiction, and the commercialization of cognitive neuroscience. She also leads a program of research and outreach devoted to improving the literacy of neuroscience and engaging stakeholders. She has also popularized the concept of neurorealism along with Eric Racine and Ofek Bar-llan.

== Other activities ==
Illes is a pioneer of the field of neuroethics through which she has made contributions to ethical, legal, social and policy challenges at the intersection of the brain sciences and biomedical ethics. Among her many international commitments, she is Immediate Past Chair of the International Brain Initiative, special Ethics Advisor to the European EuroBioImaging Consortium, an inaugural member of the Neuroethics Working Group of the European Academy of Neurology and a member of the Ethics Law and Humanities Committee of the American Academy of Neurology. She has served in many leadership roles in Canada and abroad, and as an expert for UNESCO, the OECD, the World Health Organization, and Amnesty International, among others. Neuroscience Communication, the ninth volume in her book series Developments in Neuroethics and Bioethics (Elsevier) that spans topics in pain, neurolaw, neuroarchitecture and crosscultural neuroscience, is now in press, and volume 10, Ethics, the Environment and the Exposome, is in preparation.

== Books ==
- The Strategic Grant-seeker: A Guide To Conceptualizing Fundable Research in the Brain and Behavioral Sciences (1999)
- Neuroethics: Defining the issues in theory, practice, and policy (2005)
- Addiction Neuroethics: The Ethics of Addiction Neuroscience Research and Treatment (2011)
- Ethical Issues in Behavioral Neuroscience (2015)
- Oxford Handbook of Neuroethics (2013)
- Neuroethics: Anticipating the Future (2017)
- Developments in Neuroethics and Bioethics (Pain - 2018; Global Mental Health - 2019; Do it Yourself Neurotechnologies - 2020)

== Awards and honours ==
In 2025, Illes was promoted to Officer to the Order of Canada.

- Women in Neuroscience, 2004
- Women of Distinction Award Nominee, YWCA, 2009
- Mentoring Award Nominee, Nature, 2010
- Louise Hanson Marshall Special Recognition Award, Society for Neuroscience, 2011
- Patricia Price Browne Prize in Biomedical Ethics, 2018
- Martin M. Hoffman Award for Research Excellence, UBC Faculty of Medicine, 2021
- UBC Distinguished University Scholar, 2021
- Distinguished Professor in Clinical/Applied Science, UBC Faculty of Medicine, 2021
- Prize, Italian Society of Neuroethics, Milan, Italy, 2022
- UBC Distinguished Professor in Neuroethics, 2022

== See also ==
- Neuroethics
- Incidental Findings
